World War I or the First World War, (28 June 1914 – 11 November 1918), often abbreviated as WWI, was one of the deadliest global conflicts in history. It was fought between two coalitions, the Allies (primarily France, the United Kingdom, Russia, Italy, Japan and the United States) and the Central Powers (led by Germany, Austria-Hungary, and the Ottoman Empire). Fighting occurred throughout Europe, the Middle East, Africa, the Pacific, and parts of Asia. An estimated 9 million soldiers were killed in combat, plus another 23 million wounded, while 5 million civilians died as a result of military action, hunger, and disease. Millions more died as a result of genocide, while the 1918 Spanish flu pandemic was exacerbated by the movement of combatants during the war.

The first decade of the 20th century saw increasing diplomatic tension between the European great powers. This reached breaking point on 28 June 1914, when a Bosnian Serb named Gavrilo Princip assassinated Archduke Franz Ferdinand, heir to the Austro-Hungarian throne. Austria-Hungary held Serbia responsible, and declared war on 28 July. Russia came to Serbia’s defence, and by 4 August, defensive alliances had drawn in Germany, France and Britain.

German strategy in 1914 was to first defeat France, then attack Russia. However, this failed, and by the end of 1914, the Western Front consisted of a continuous line of trenches stretching from the English Channel to Switzerland. The Eastern Front was more fluid, but neither side could gain a decisive advantage, despite a series of costly offensives. Attempts by both sides to bypass the stalemate caused fighting to expand into the Middle East, the Alps, the Balkans and overseas colonies, bringing Bulgaria, Romania, Greece and others into the war.

The United States entered the war on the side of the Allies in April 1917, while the Bolsheviks seized power in the Russian October Revolution, and made peace with the Central Powers in early 1918. Freed from the Eastern Front, Germany launched an offensive in the west on March 1918, hoping to achieve a decisive victory before American troops arrived in significant numbers. Failure left the German Imperial Army exhausted and demoralised, and when the Allies took the offensive in August 1918, they could not stop the advance.

Between 29 September and 3 November 1918, Bulgaria, the Ottoman Empire and Austria-Hungary agreed to armistices with the Allies, leaving Germany isolated. Facing revolution at home, and with his army on the verge of mutiny, Kaiser Wilhelm II abdicated on 9 November. The Armistice of 11 November 1918 brought the fighting to a close, while the Paris Peace Conference imposed various settlements on the defeated powers, the best-known being the Treaty of Versailles. The dissolution of the Russian, German, Austro-Hungarian and Ottoman Empires resulted in the creation of new independent states, among them Poland, Czechoslovakia, and Yugoslavia. Failure to manage the instability that resulted from this upheaval during the interwar period contributed to the outbreak of World War II in September 1939.

Names 
The term world war was first coined in September 1914 by German biologist and philosopher Ernst Haeckel. He claimed that "there is no doubt that the course and character of the feared 'European War' ... will become the first world war in the full sense of the word," in The Indianapolis Star on 20 September 1914.

The term First World War (often abbreviated as WWI or WW1), had been used by Lt-Col. Charles à Court Repington, as a title for his memoirs (published in 1920); he had noted his discussion on the matter with a Major Johnstone of Harvard University in his diary entry of 10 September 1918.
Prior to World War II, the events of 1914–1918 were generally known as the Great War or simply the World War. In August 1914, The Independent magazine wrote "This is the Great War. It names itself". In October 1914, the Canadian magazine Maclean's similarly wrote, "Some wars name themselves. This is the Great War." Contemporary Europeans also referred to it as "the war to end war" and it was also described as "the war to end all wars" due to their perception of its then-unparalleled scale, devastation, and loss of life. After World WarII began in 1939, the terms became more standard, with British Empire historians, including Canadians, favouring "The First World War" and Americans "World WarI".

Background

Political and military alliances 

For much of the 19th century, the major European powers maintained a tenuous balance of power among themselves, known as the Concert of Europe. After 1848, this was challenged by a variety of factors, including Britain's withdrawal into so-called splendid isolation, the decline of the Ottoman Empire, New Imperialism, and the rise of Prussia under Otto von Bismarck. The 1866 Austro-Prussian War established Prussian hegemony in Germany, while victory in the 1870–1871 Franco-Prussian War allowed Bismarck to consolidate the German states into a German Empire under Prussian leadership. Avenging the defeat of 1871, or revanchism, and recovering the provinces of Alsace-Lorraine became the principal objects of French policy for the next forty years.

In order to isolate France and avoid a war on two fronts, Bismarck negotiated the League of the Three Emperors (German: Dreikaiserbund) between Austria-Hungary, Russia and Germany. After Russian victory in the 1877–1878 Russo-Turkish War, the League was dissolved due to Austrian concerns over Russian influence in the Balkans, an area they considered of vital strategic interest. Germany and Austria-Hungary then formed the 1879 Dual Alliance, which became the Triple Alliance when Italy joined in 1882. For Bismarck, the purpose of these agreements was to isolate France by ensuring the three Empires resolved any disputes between themselves; when this was threatened in 1880 by British and French attempts to negotiate directly with Russia, he reformed the League in 1881, which was renewed in 1883 and 1885. After the agreement lapsed in 1887, he replaced it with the Reinsurance Treaty, a secret agreement between Germany and Russia to remain neutral if either were attacked by France or Austria-Hungary.

Bismarck viewed peace with Russia as the foundation of German foreign policy but after becoming Kaiser in 1890, Wilhelm II forced him to retire and was persuaded not to renew the Reinsurance Treaty by Leo von Caprivi, his new Chancellor. This provided France an opportunity to counteract the Triple Alliance, by signing the Franco-Russian Alliance in 1894, followed by the 1904 Entente Cordiale with Britain, and the Triple Entente was completed by the 1907 Anglo-Russian Convention. While these were not formal alliances, by settling long-standing colonial disputes in Africa and Asia, British entry into any future conflict involving France or Russia became a possibility. British and Russian support for France against Germany during the Agadir Crisis in 1911 reinforced their relationship and increased Anglo-German estrangement, deepening the divisions that would erupt in 1914.

Arms race 

German industrial strength significantly increased after 1871, driven by the creation of a unified Reich, French indemnity payments, and the annexation of Alsace-Lorraine. Backed by Wilhelm II, Admiral Alfred von Tirpitz sought to use this growth in economic power to build a Kaiserliche Marine, or Imperial German Navy, which could compete with the British Royal Navy for world naval supremacy. His thinking was influenced by US naval strategist Alfred Thayer Mahan, who argued possession of a blue-water navy was vital for global power projection; Tirpitz had his books translated into German, while Wilhelm made them required reading for his advisors and senior military personnel.

However, it was also an emotional decision, driven by Wilhelm's simultaneous admiration for the Royal Navy and desire to outdo it. Bismarck calculated that Britain would not interfere in Europe so long as its maritime supremacy remained secure, but his dismissal in 1890 led to a change in policy and an Anglo-German naval arms race. Ultimately, the race diverted huge resources into creating a German navy large enough to antagonise Britain, but not defeat it; in 1911, Chancellor Theobald von Bethmann Hollweg acknowledged defeat, leading to the Rüstungswende or 'armaments turning point', when he switched expenditure from the navy to the army.

This decision was not driven by a reduction in political tensions, but German concern over Russia's recovery from defeat in the Russo-Japanese War and subsequent 1905 Russian Revolution. Economic reforms backed by French funding led to a significant post-1908 expansion of railways and infrastructure, particularly in its western border regions. Since Germany and Austria-Hungary relied on faster mobilisation to compensate for their numerical inferiority compared to Russia, the threat posed by the closing of this gap was more important than competing with the Royal Navy. After Germany expanded its standing army by 170,000 troops in 1913, France extended compulsory military service from two to three years; similar measures were taken by the Balkan powers and Italy, which led to increased expenditure by the Ottomans and Austria-Hungary. Absolute figures are hard to calculate due to differences in categorising expenditure, since they often omit civilian infrastructure projects like railways which also had a military use. However, from 1908 to 1913, military spending by the six major European powers increased by over 50% in real terms.

Conflicts in the Balkans 

The years before 1914 were marked by a series of crises in the Balkans as other powers sought to benefit from Ottoman decline. While Pan-Slavic and Orthodox Russia considered itself the protector of Serbia and other Slav states, they preferred the strategically vital Bosporus straits to be controlled by a weak Ottoman government, rather than an ambitious Slav power like Bulgaria. Since Russia had its own ambitions in northeastern Anatolia and their clients had over-lapping claims in the Balkans, balancing these divided Russian policy-makers and added to regional instability.

Austrian statesmen viewed the Balkans as essential for the continued existence of their Empire and Serbian expansion as a direct threat. The 1908–1909 Bosnian Crisis began when Austria annexed the former Ottoman territory of Bosnia and Herzegovina, which it had occupied since 1878. Timed to coincide with the Bulgarian Declaration of Independence from the Ottoman Empire, this unilateral action was denounced by the European powers, but accepted as there was no consensus on how to reverse it. Some historians see this as a significant escalation, ending any chance of Austria co-operating with Russia in the Balkans while damaging relations with Serbia and Italy, both of whom had their own expansionist ambitions in the region.

Tensions increased after the 1911-1912 Italo-Turkish War demonstrated Ottoman weakness and led to the formation of the Balkan League, an alliance of Serbia, Bulgaria, Montenegro, and Greece. The League quickly over-ran most of Ottoman Balkan territory in the 1912-1913 First Balkan War, much to the surprise of outside observers. The Serbian capture of ports on the Adriatic resulted in partial Austrian mobilisation on 21 November 1912, including units along the Russian border in Galicia. In a meeting the next day, the Russian government decided not to mobilise in response, unwilling to precipitate a war for which they were not yet prepared.

The Great Powers sought to re-assert control through the 1913 Treaty of London, which created an independent Albania, while enlarging the territories of Bulgaria, Serbia, Montenegro and Greece. However, disputes between the victors sparked the 33-day Second Balkan War, when Bulgaria attacked Serbia and Greece on 16 June 1913; it was defeated, losing most of Macedonia to Serbia and Greece, and Southern Dobruja to Romania. The result was that even countries which benefited from the Balkan Wars, such as Serbia and Greece, felt cheated of their "rightful gains", while for Austria it demonstrated the apparent indifference with which other powers viewed their concerns, including Germany. This complex mix of resentment, nationalism and insecurity helps explain why the pre-1914 Balkans became known as the "powder keg of Europe".

Prelude

Sarajevo assassination 

On 28 June 1914, Archduke Franz Ferdinand of Austria, heir presumptive to Emperor Franz Joseph, visited Sarajevo, capital of the recently annexed provinces of Bosnia and Herzegovina. Six assassins from the movement known as Young Bosnia, or Mlada Bosna, took up positions along the route taken by the Archduke's motorcade, with the intention of assassinating him. Supplied with arms by extremists within the Serbian Black Hand intelligence organisation, they hoped his death would free Bosnia from Austrian rule, although there was little agreement on what would replace it.

Nedeljko Čabrinović threw a grenade at the Archduke's car and injured two of his aides, who were taken to hospital while the convoy carried on. The other assassins were also unsuccessful but an hour later, as Ferdinand was returning from visiting the injured officers, his car took a wrong turn into a street where Gavrilo Princip was standing. He stepped forward and fired two pistol shots, fatally wounding Ferdinand and his wife Sophie, who both died shortly thereafter. Although Emperor Franz Joseph was shocked by the incident, political and personal differences meant the two men were not close; allegedly, his first reported comment was "A higher power has re-established the order which I, alas, could not preserve".

According to historian Zbyněk Zeman, his reaction was reflected more broadly in Vienna, where "the event almost failed to make any impression whatsoever. On 28 and 29 June, the crowds listened to music and drank wine, as if nothing had happened." Nevertheless, the impact of the murder of the heir to the throne was significant, and has been described by historian Christopher Clark as a "9/11 effect, a terrorist event charged with historic meaning, transforming the political chemistry in Vienna".

Expansion of violence in Bosnia and Herzegovina 

The Austro-Hungarian authorities encouraged the subsequent anti-Serb riots in Sarajevo, in which Bosnian Croats and Bosniaks killed two Bosnian Serbs and damaged numerous Serb-owned buildings. Violent actions against ethnic Serbs were also organised outside Sarajevo, in other cities in Austro-Hungarian-controlled Bosnia and Herzegovina, Croatia and Slovenia. Austro-Hungarian authorities in Bosnia and Herzegovina imprisoned and extradited approximately 5,500 prominent Serbs, 700 to 2,200 of whom died in prison. A further 460 Serbs were sentenced to death. A predominantly Bosniak special militia known as the Schutzkorps was established and carried out the persecution of Serbs.

July Crisis 

The assassination initiated the July Crisis, a month of diplomatic manoeuvring between Austria-Hungary, Germany, Russia, France and Britain. Believing Serbian intelligence helped organise Franz Ferdinand's murder, Austrian officials wanted to use the opportunity to end their interference in Bosnia and saw war as the best way of achieving this. However, the Foreign Ministry had no solid proof of Serbian involvement and a dossier used to make its case was riddled with errors. On 23July, Austria delivered an ultimatum to Serbia, listing ten demands made intentionally unacceptable to provide an excuse for starting hostilities.

Serbia ordered general mobilisation on 25July, but accepted all the terms, except for those empowering Austrian representatives to suppress "subversive elements" inside Serbia, and take part in the investigation and trial of Serbians linked to the assassination. Claiming this amounted to rejection, Austria broke off diplomatic relations and ordered partial mobilisation the next day; on 28 July, they declared war on Serbia and began shelling Belgrade. Having initiated war preparations on 25 July, Russia now ordered general mobilisation in support of Serbia on 30th.

Anxious to ensure backing from the SPD political opposition by presenting Russia as the aggressor, Bethmann Hollweg delayed commencement of war preparations until 31 July. That afternoon the Russian government were handed a note requiring them to "cease all war measures against Germany and Austria-Hungary" within 12 hours. A further German demand for neutrality was refused by the French who ordered general mobilisation but delayed declaring war. The German General Staff had long assumed they faced a war on two fronts; the Schlieffen Plan envisaged using 80% of the army to defeat France in the west, then switch to Russia. Since this required them to move quickly, mobilisation orders were issued that afternoon.

At a meeting on 29 July, the British cabinet had narrowly decided its obligations to Belgium under the 1839 Treaty of London did not require it to oppose a German invasion with military force. However, this was largely driven by Prime Minister Asquith's desire to maintain unity; he and his senior Cabinet ministers were already committed to support France, the Royal Navy had been mobilised and public opinion was strongly in favour of intervention. On 31 July, Britain sent notes to Germany and France, asking them to respect Belgian neutrality; France pledged to do so, Germany did not reply.

Once the German ultimatum to Russia expired on the morning of 1 August, the two countries were at war. Later the same day, Wilhelm was informed by his ambassador in London, Prince Lichnowsky, that Britain would remain neutral if France was not attacked, and might not intervene at all given the ongoing Home Rule Crisis in Ireland. Jubilant at this news, he ordered General Moltke, the German chief of staff, to "march the whole of the... army to the East". This allegedly brought Moltke to the verge of a nervous breakdown, who protested that "it cannot be done. The deployment of millions cannot be improvised." Lichnowsky soon realised he was mistaken, although Wilhelm insisted on waiting for a telegram from his cousin George V; once received it confirmed there had been a misunderstanding, and he told Moltke, "Now do what you want."

Aware of German plans to attack through Belgium, French Commander-in-Chief Joseph Joffre asked his government for permission to cross the border and pre-empt such a move. To avoid a violation of Belgian neutrality, he was told any advance could come only after a German invasion. On 2 August, Germany occupied Luxembourg and exchanged fire with French units; on 3August, they declared war on France and demanded free passage across Belgium, which was refused. Early on the morning of 4August, the Germans invaded and Albert I of Belgium called for assistance under the Treaty of London. Britain sent Germany an ultimatum demanding they withdraw from Belgium; when this expired at midnight without a response, the two empires were at war.

Progress of the war

Opening hostilities

Confusion among the Central Powers 
The strategy of the Central Powers suffered from miscommunication. Germany had promised to support Austria-Hungary's invasion of Serbia, but interpretations of what this meant differed. Previously tested deployment plans had been replaced early in 1914, but those had never been tested in exercises. Austro-Hungarian leaders believed Germany would cover its northern flank against Russia. Germany, however, envisioned Austria-Hungary directing most of its troops against Russia, while Germany dealt with France. This confusion forced the Austro-Hungarian Army to divide its forces between the Russian and Serbian fronts.

Serbian campaign 

Beginning on 12 August, the Austrian and Serbs clashed at the battles of the Cer and Kolubara; over the next two weeks, Austrian attacks were repulsed with heavy losses, dashing their hopes of a swift victory and marking the first major Allied victories of the war. As a result, Austria had to keep sizeable forces on the Serbian front, weakening its efforts against Russia. Serbia's defeat of the 1914 invasion has been called one of the major upset victories of the twentieth century. In spring 1915, the campaign saw the first use of anti-aircraft warfare after an Austrian plane was shot down with ground-to-air fire, as well as the first medical evacuation by the Serbian army in autumn 1915.

German offensive in Belgium and France 

Upon mobilisation in 1914, 80% of the German Army was located on the Western Front, with the remainder acting as a screening force in the East; officially titled Aufmarsch II West, it is better known as the Schlieffen Plan after its creator, Alfred von Schlieffen, head of the German General Staff from 1891 to 1906. Rather than a direct attack across their shared frontier, the German right wing would sweep through the Netherlands and Belgium, then swing south, encircling Paris and trapping the French army against the Swiss border. Schlieffen estimated this would take six weeks, after which the German army would transfer to the East and defeat the Russians.

The plan was substantially modified by his successor, Helmuth von Moltke the Younger. Under Schlieffen, 85% of German forces in the west were assigned to the right wing, with the remainder holding along the frontier. By keeping his left wing deliberately weak, he hoped to lure the French into an offensive into the "lost provinces" of Alsace-Lorraine, which was in fact the strategy envisaged by their Plan XVII. However, Moltke grew concerned the French might push too hard on his left flank and as the German Army increased in size from 1908 to 1914, he changed the allocation of forces between the two wings from 85:15 to 70:30. He also considered Dutch neutrality essential for German trade and cancelled the incursion into the Netherlands, which meant any delays in Belgium threatened the entire viability of the plan. Historian Richard Holmes argues these changes meant the right wing was not strong enough to achieve decisive success and thus led to unrealistic goals and timings.

The initial German advance in the West was very successful and by the end of August the Allied left, which included the British Expeditionary Force (BEF), was in full retreat. At the same time, the French offensive in Alsace-Lorraine was a disastrous failure, with casualties exceeding 260,000, including 27,000 killed on 22 August during the Battle of the Frontiers. German planning provided broad strategic instructions, while allowing army commanders considerable freedom in carrying them out at the front; this worked well in 1866 and 1870 but in 1914, von Kluck used this freedom to disobey orders, opening a gap between the German armies as they closed on Paris.

In 1911, the Russian Stavka had agreed with the French to attack Germany within fifteen days of mobilisation, ten days before the Germans had anticipated, although it meant the two Russian armies that entered East Prussia on 17 August did so without many of their support elements. Although the Russian Second Army was effectively destroyed at the Battle of Tannenberg on 26–30 August, their advance caused the Germans to re-route their 8th Field Army from France to East Prussia, a factor in Allied victory on the Marne.

By the end of 1914, German troops held strong defensive positions inside France, controlled the bulk of France's domestic coalfields and had inflicted 230,000 more casualties than it lost itself. However, communications problems and questionable command decisions cost Germany the chance of a decisive outcome, while it had failed to achieve the primary objective of avoiding a long, two-front war. As was apparent to a number of German leaders, this amounted to a strategic defeat; shortly after the Marne, Crown Prince Wilhelm told an American reporter; "We have lost the war. It will go on for a long time but lost it is already."

Asia and the Pacific 

On 30 August 1914, New Zealand occupied German Samoa, now the independent state of Samoa. On 11 September, the Australian Naval and Military Expeditionary Force landed on the island of New Britain, then part of German New Guinea. On 28 October, the German cruiser  sank the Russian cruiser Zhemchug in the Battle of Penang. Japan declared war on Germany prior to seizing territories in the Pacific which later became the South Seas Mandate, as well as German Treaty ports on the Chinese Shandong peninsula at Tsingtao. After Vienna refused to withdraw its cruiser  from Tsingtao, Japan declared war on Austria-Hungary as well, and the ship was sunk at Tsingtao in November 1914. Within a few months, Allied forces had seized all German territories in the Pacific, leaving only isolated commerce raiders and a few holdouts in New Guinea.

African campaigns 

Some of the first clashes of the war involved British, French, and German colonial forces in Africa. On 6–7 August, French and British troops invaded the German protectorate of Togoland and Kamerun. On 10 August, German forces in South-West Africa attacked South Africa; sporadic and fierce fighting continued for the rest of the war. The German colonial forces in German East Africa, led by Colonel Paul von Lettow-Vorbeck, fought a guerrilla warfare campaign during World WarI and only surrendered two weeks after the armistice took effect in Europe.

Indian support for the Allies 

Prior to the war, Germany had attempted to use Indian nationalism and pan-Islamism to its advantage, a policy continued post-1914 by instigating uprisings in India, while the Niedermayer–Hentig Expedition urged Afghanistan to join the war on the side of Central Powers. However, contrary to British fears of a revolt in India, the outbreak of the war saw a reduction in nationalist activity. This was largely because leaders from the Indian National Congress and other groups believed support for the British war effort would hasten Indian Home Rule, a promise allegedly made explicit in 1917 by Edwin Montagu, then Secretary of State for India.

In 1914, the British Indian Army was larger than the British Army itself, and between 1914 and 1918 an estimated 1.3 million Indian soldiers and labourers served in Europe, Africa, and the Middle East, while the Government of India and their princely allies supplied large quantities of food, money, and ammunition. In all, 140,000 soldiers served on the Western Front and nearly 700,000 in the Middle East, with 47,746 killed and 65,126 wounded.
The suffering engendered by the war, as well as the failure of the British government to grant self-government to India after the end of hostilities, bred disillusionment and fuelled the campaign for full independence that would be led by Mahatma Gandhi and others.

Western Front 1914 to 1916

Trench warfare begins 

Pre-war military tactics that emphasised open warfare and the individual rifleman proved obsolete when confronted with conditions prevailing in 1914. Technological advances allowed the creation of strong defensive systems largely impervious to massed infantry advances, such as barbed wire, machine guns and above all far more powerful artillery, which dominated the battlefield and made crossing open ground extremely difficult. Both sides struggled to develop tactics for breaching entrenched positions without suffering heavy casualties. In time, however, technology began to produce new offensive weapons, such as gas warfare and the tank.

After the First Battle of the Marne in September 1914, Allied and German forces unsuccessfully tried to outflank each other, a series of manoeuvres later known as the "Race to the Sea". By the end of 1914, the opposing forces confronted each other along an uninterrupted line of entrenched positions from the Channel to the Swiss border. Since the Germans were normally able to choose where to stand, they generally held the high ground, while their trenches tended to be better built; those constructed by the French and English were initially considered "temporary", only needed until an offensive would smash the German defences. Both sides tried to break the stalemate using scientific and technological advances. On 22 April 1915, at the Second Battle of Ypres, the Germans (violating the Hague Convention) used chlorine gas for the first time on the Western Front. Several types of gas soon became widely used by both sides, and though it never proved a decisive, battle-winning weapon, it became one of the most-feared and best-remembered horrors of the war.

Continuation of trench warfare 
Neither side proved able to deliver a decisive blow for the next two years. Throughout 1915–17, the British Empire and France suffered more casualties than Germany, because of both the strategic and tactical stances chosen by the sides. Strategically, while the Germans mounted only one major offensive, the Allies made several attempts to break through the German lines.

In February 1916 the Germans attacked French defensive positions at the Battle of Verdun, lasting until December 1916. The Germans made initial gains, before French counter-attacks returned matters to near their starting point. Casualties were greater for the French, but the Germans bled heavily as well, with anywhere from 700,000 to 975,000 casualties suffered between the two combatants. Verdun became a symbol of French determination and self-sacrifice.

The Battle of the Somme was an Anglo-French offensive of July to November 1916. The opening day on 1 July 1916 was the bloodiest single day in the history of the British Army, which suffered 57,470 casualties, including 19,240 dead. As a whole, the Somme offensive led to an estimated 420,000 British casualties, along with 200,000 French and 500,000 German. Gun fire was not the only factor taking lives; the diseases that emerged in the trenches were a major killer on both sides. The living conditions made it so that countless diseases and infections occurred, such as trench foot, shell shock, blindness/burns from mustard gas, lice, trench fever, "cooties" (body lice) and the 'Spanish flu'.

Naval war 

At the start of the war, German cruisers were scattered across the globe, some of which were subsequently used to attack Allied merchant shipping. The British Royal Navy systematically hunted them down, though not without some embarrassment from its inability to protect Allied shipping. For example, the light cruiser , which was part of the German East Asia Squadron stationed at Qingdao, seized or sank 15 merchantmen, as well as a Russian cruiser and a French destroyer. Most of the squadron was returning to Germany when it sank two British armoured cruisers at the Battle of Coronel in November 1914, before being virtually destroyed at the Battle of the Falkland Islands in December. The SMS Dresden escaped with a few auxiliaries, but after the Battle of Más a Tierra, these too had either been destroyed or interned.

Soon after the outbreak of hostilities, Britain began a naval blockade of Germany. The strategy proved effective, cutting off vital military and civilian supplies, although this blockade violated accepted international law codified by several international agreements of the past two centuries. Britain mined international waters to prevent any ships from entering entire sections of ocean, causing danger to even neutral ships. Since there was limited response to this tactic of the British, Germany expected a similar response to its unrestricted submarine warfare.

The Battle of Jutland (German: Skagerrakschlacht, or "Battle of the Skagerrak") in May/June 1916 developed into the largest naval battle of the war. It was the only full-scale clash of battleships during the war, and one of the largest in history. The Kaiserliche Marine's High Seas Fleet, commanded by Vice Admiral Reinhard Scheer, fought the Royal Navy's Grand Fleet, led by Admiral Sir John Jellicoe. The engagement was a stand off, as the Germans were outmanoeuvred by the larger British fleet, but managed to escape and inflicted more damage to the British fleet than they received. Strategically, however, the British asserted their control of the sea, and the bulk of the German surface fleet remained confined to port for the duration of the war.

German U-boats attempted to cut the supply lines between North America and Britain. The nature of submarine warfare meant that attacks often came without warning, giving the crews of the merchant ships little hope of survival. The United States launched a protest, and Germany changed its rules of engagement. After the sinking of the passenger ship RMS Lusitania in 1915, Germany promised not to target passenger liners, while Britain armed its merchant ships, placing them beyond the protection of the "cruiser rules", which demanded warning and movement of crews to "a place of safety" (a standard that lifeboats did not meet). Finally, in early 1917, Germany adopted a policy of unrestricted submarine warfare, realising the Americans would eventually enter the war. Germany sought to strangle Allied sea lanes before the United States could transport a large army overseas, but after initial successes eventually failed to do so.

The U-boat threat lessened in 1917, when merchant ships began travelling in convoys, escorted by destroyers. This tactic made it difficult for U-boats to find targets, which significantly lessened losses; after the hydrophone and depth charges were introduced, accompanying destroyers could attack a submerged submarine with some hope of success. Convoys slowed the flow of supplies since ships had to wait as convoys were assembled. The solution to the delays was an extensive program of building new freighters. Troopships were too fast for the submarines and did not travel the North Atlantic in convoys. The U-boats had sunk more than 5,000 Allied ships, at a cost of 199 submarines.

World War I also saw the first use of aircraft carriers in combat, with  launching Sopwith Camels in a successful raid against the Zeppelin hangars at Tondern in July 1918, as well as blimps for antisubmarine patrol.

Southern theatres

War in the Balkans 

Faced with Russia in the east, Austria-Hungary could spare only one-third of its army to attack Serbia. After suffering heavy losses, the Austrians briefly occupied the Serbian capital, Belgrade. A Serbian counter-attack in the Battle of Kolubara succeeded in driving them from the country by the end of 1914. For the first ten months of 1915, Austria-Hungary used most of its military reserves to fight Italy. German and Austro-Hungarian diplomats, however, scored a coup by persuading Bulgaria to join the attack on Serbia. The Austro-Hungarian provinces of Slovenia, Croatia and Bosnia provided troops for Austria-Hungary in the fight with Serbia, Russia and Italy. Montenegro allied itself with Serbia.

Bulgaria declared war on Serbia on 14 October 1915 and joined in the attack by the Austro-Hungarian army under Mackensen's army of 250,000 that was already underway. Serbia was conquered in a little more than a month, as the Central Powers, now including Bulgaria, sent in 600,000 troops total. The Serbian army, fighting on two fronts and facing certain defeat, retreated into northern Albania. The Serbs suffered defeat in the Battle of Kosovo. Montenegro covered the Serbian retreat towards the Adriatic coast in the Battle of Mojkovac in 6–7 January 1916, but ultimately the Austrians also conquered Montenegro. The surviving Serbian soldiers were evacuated by ship to Greece. After conquest, Serbia was divided between Austro-Hungary and Bulgaria.

In late 1915, a Franco-British force landed at Salonica in Greece to offer assistance and to pressure its government to declare war against the Central Powers. However, the pro-German King Constantine I dismissed the pro-Allied government of Eleftherios Venizelos before the Allied expeditionary force arrived. The friction between the King of Greece and the Allies continued to accumulate with the National Schism, which effectively divided Greece between regions still loyal to the king and the new provisional government of Venizelos in Salonica. After intense negotiations and an armed confrontation in Athens between Allied and royalist forces (an incident known as Noemvriana), the King of Greece resigned and his second son Alexander took his place; Greece officially joined the war on the side of the Allies in June 1917.

The Macedonian front was initially mostly static. French and Serbian forces retook limited areas of Macedonia by recapturing Bitola on 19 November 1916 following the costly Monastir offensive, which brought stabilisation of the front.

Serbian and French troops finally made a breakthrough in September 1918 in the Vardar offensive, after most of the German and Austro-Hungarian troops had been withdrawn. The Bulgarians were defeated at the Battle of Dobro Pole, and by 25 September British and French troops had crossed the border into Bulgaria proper as the Bulgarian army collapsed. Bulgaria capitulated four days later, on 29 September 1918. The German high command responded by despatching troops to hold the line, but these forces were far too weak to re-establish a front.

The disappearance of the Macedonian front meant that the road to Budapest and Vienna was now opened to Allied forces. Hindenburg and Ludendorff concluded that the strategic and operational balance had now shifted decidedly against the Central Powers and, a day after the Bulgarian collapse, insisted on an immediate peace settlement.

Ottoman Empire 

The Ottomans threatened Russia's Caucasian territories and Britain's communications with India via the Suez Canal. As the conflict progressed, the Ottoman Empire took advantage of the European powers' preoccupation with the war and conducted large-scale ethnic cleansing of the indigenous Armenian, Greek, and Assyrian Christian populations, known as the Armenian genocide, Greek genocide, and Assyrian genocide.

The British and French opened overseas fronts with the Gallipoli (1915) and Mesopotamian campaigns (1914). In Gallipoli, the Ottoman Empire successfully repelled the British, French, and Australian and New Zealand Army Corps (ANZACs). In Mesopotamia, by contrast, after the defeat of the British defenders in the siege of Kut by the Ottomans (1915–16), British Imperial forces reorganised and captured Baghdad in March 1917. The British were aided in Mesopotamia by local Arab and Assyrian fighters, while the Ottomans employed local Kurdish and Turcoman tribes.

Further to the west, the Suez Canal was defended from Ottoman attacks in 1915 and 1916; in August, a German and Ottoman force was defeated at the Battle of Romani by the ANZAC Mounted Division and the 52nd (Lowland) Infantry Division. Following this victory, an Egyptian Expeditionary Force advanced across the Sinai Peninsula, pushing Ottoman forces back in the Battle of Magdhaba in December and the Battle of Rafa on the border between the Egyptian Sinai and Ottoman Palestine in January 1917.

Russian armies generally had success in the Caucasus campaign. Enver Pasha, supreme commander of the Ottoman armed forces, was ambitious and dreamed of re-conquering central Asia and areas that had been lost to Russia previously. He was, however, a poor commander. He launched an offensive against the Russians in the Caucasus in December 1914 with 100,000 troops, insisting on a frontal attack against mountainous Russian positions in winter. He lost 86% of his force at the Battle of Sarikamish.

The Ottoman Empire, with German support, invaded Persia (modern Iran) in December 1914 in an effort to cut off British and Russian access to petroleum reservoirs around Baku near the Caspian Sea. Persia, ostensibly neutral, had long been under the spheres of British and Russian influence. The Ottomans and Germans were aided by Kurdish and Azeri forces, together with a large number of major Iranian tribes, such as the Qashqai, Tangistanis, Lurs, and Khamseh, while the Russians and British had the support of Armenian and Assyrian forces. The Persian campaign was to last until 1918 and end in failure for the Ottomans and their allies. However, the Russian withdrawal from the war in 1917 led to Armenian and Assyrian forces, who had hitherto inflicted a series of defeats upon the forces of the Ottomans and their allies, being cut off from supply lines, outnumbered, outgunned and isolated, forcing them to fight and flee towards British lines in northern Mesopotamia.

General Yudenich, the Russian commander from 1915 to 1916, drove the Turks out of most of the southern Caucasus with a string of victories. During the 1916 campaign, the Russians defeated the Turks in the Erzurum offensive, also occupying Trabzon. In 1917, Russian Grand Duke Nicholas assumed command of the Caucasus front. Nicholas planned a railway from Russian Georgia to the conquered territories so that fresh supplies could be brought up for a new offensive in 1917. However, in March 1917 (February in the pre-revolutionary Russian calendar), the Tsar abdicated in the course of the February Revolution, and the Russian Caucasus Army began to fall apart.

The Arab Revolt, instigated by the Arab bureau of the British Foreign Office, started June 1916 with the Battle of Mecca, led by Sharif Hussein of Mecca, and ended with the Ottoman surrender of Damascus. Fakhri Pasha, the Ottoman commander of Medina, resisted for more than two and half years during the siege of Medina before surrendering in January 1919. 

The Senussi tribe, along the border of Italian Libya and British Egypt, incited and armed by the Turks, waged a small-scale guerrilla war against Allied troops. The British were forced to dispatch 12,000 troops to oppose them in the Senussi campaign. Their rebellion was finally crushed in mid-1916.

Total Allied casualties on the Ottoman fronts amounted 650,000 men. Total Ottoman casualties were 725,000, with 325,000 dead and 400,000 wounded.

Italian Front 

Although Italy joined the Triple Alliance in 1882, a treaty with its traditional Austrian enemy was so controversial that subsequent governments denied its existence and the terms were only made public in 1915. This arose from nationalist designs on Austro-Hungarian territory in Trentino, the Austrian Littoral, Rijeka and Dalmatia, which were considered vital to secure the borders established in 1866. In 1902, Rome secretly agreed with France to remain neutral if the latter was attacked by Germany, effectively nullifying its role in the Triple Alliance. 

When the war began in 1914, Italy argued the Triple Alliance was defensive in nature and it was not obliged to support an Austrian attack on Serbia. Opposition to joining the Central Powers increased when Turkey became a member in September, since in 1911 Italy had occupied Ottoman possessions in Libya and the Dodecanese islands. To secure Italian neutrality, the Central Powers offered them the French protectorate of Tunisia, while in return for an immediate entry into the war, the Allies agreed to their demands for Austrian territory and sovereignty over the Dodecanese. Although they remained secret, these provisions were incorporated into the April 1915 Treaty of London; Italy joined the Triple Entente and on 23 May declared war on Austria-Hungary, followed by Germany fifteen months later.

The pre-1914 Italian army was the weakest in Europe, short of officers, trained men, adequate transport and modern weapons; by April 1915, some of these deficiencies had been remedied but it was still unprepared for the major offensive required by the Treaty of London. The advantage of superior numbers was offset by the difficult terrain; much of the fighting took place at altitudes of over 3000 metres in the Alps and Dolomites, where trench lines had to be cut through rock and ice and keeping troops supplied was a major challenge. These issues were exacerbated by unimaginative strategies and tactics. Between 1915 and 1917, the Italian commander, Luigi Cadorna, undertook a series of frontal assaults along the Isonzo which made little progress and cost many lives; by the end of the war, total Italian combat deaths totalled around 548,000.

In the spring of 1916, the Austro-Hungarians counterattacked in Asiago in the Strafexpedition, but made little progress and were pushed by the Italians back to the Tyrol. Although an Italian corps occupied southern Albania in May 1916, their main focus was the Isonzo front which after the capture of Gorizia in August 1916 remained static until October 1917. After a combined Austro-German force won a major victory at Caporetto, Cadorna was replaced by Armando Diaz who retreated more than  before holding positions along the Piave River. A second Austrian offensive was repulsed in June 1918 and by October it was clear the Central Powers had lost the war. On 24 October, Diaz launched the Battle of Vittorio Veneto and initially met stubborn resistance,  but with Austria-Hungary collapsing, Hungarian divisions in Italy now demanded they be sent home. When this was granted, many others followed and the Imperial army disintegrated, the Italians taking over 300,000 prisoners. On 3November, the Armistice of Villa Giusti ended hostilities between Austria-Hungary and Italy which occupied Trieste and areas along the Adriatic Sea awarded to it in 1915.

Romanian participation 

Despite secretly agreeing to support the Triple Alliance in 1883, Romania increasingly found itself at odds with the Central Powers over their support for Bulgaria in the 1912 to 1913 Balkan Wars and the status of ethnic Romanian communities in Hungarian-controlled Transylvania, which comprised an estimated 2.8 million of the 5.0 million population. With the ruling elite split into pro-German and pro-Entente factions, Romania remained neutral in 1914, arguing like Italy that because Austria-Hungary had declared war on Serbia, it was under no obligation to join them. They maintained this position for the next two years, while allowing Germany and Austria to transport military supplies and advisors across Romanian territory.

In September 1914, Russia had acknowledged Romanian rights to Austro-Hungarian territories including Transylvania and Banat, whose acquisition had widespread popular support,  and Russian success against Austria led Romania to join the Entente in the August 1916 Treaty of Bucharest. Under the strategic plan known as Hypothesis Z, the Romanian army planned an offensive into Transylvania, while defending Southern Dobruja and Giurgiu against a possible Bulgarian counterattack. On 27 August 1916, they attacked Transylvania and occupied substantial parts of the province before being driven back by the recently formed German 9th Army, led by former Chief of Staff Falkenhayn. A combined German-Bulgarian-Turkish offensive captured Dobruja and Giurgiu, although the bulk of the Romanian army managed to escape encirclement and retreated to Bucharest, which surrendered to the Central Powers on 6 December 1916.

Approximately 16% of the pre-war Austro-Hungarian population consisted of ethnic Romanians, whose loyalty faded as the war progressed; by 1917, they made up more than 50% of the 300,000 deserters from the Imperial army. Prisoners of war held by the Russian Empire formed the Romanian Volunteer Corps who were repatriated to Romania in 1917. Many fought in the battles of Mărăști, Mărășești and Oituz, where with Russian support the Romanian army managed to defeat an offensive by the Central Powers and even take back some territory. Left isolated after the October Revolution forced Russia out of the war, Romania signed an armistice on 9 December 1917. Shortly afterwards, fighting broke out in the adjacent Russian territory of Bessarabia between Bolsheviks and Romanian nationalists, who requested military assistance from their compatriots. Following their intervention, the independent Moldavian Democratic Republic was formed in February 1918, which voted for union with Romania on 27 March.

On 7 May 1918 Romania signed the Treaty of Bucharest with the Central Powers, which recognised Romanian sovereignty over Bessarabia in return for ceding control of passes in the Carpathian Mountains to Austria-Hungary and granting oil concessions to Germany. Although approved by Parliament, Ferdinand I refused to sign the treaty, hoping for an Allied victory; Romania re-entered the war on 10 November 1918 on the side of the Allies and the Treaty of Bucharest was formally annulled by the Armistice of 11 November 1918. Between 1914 and 1918, an estimated 400,000 to 600,000 ethnic Romanians served with the Austro-Hungarian army, of whom up to 150,000 were killed in action; total military and civilian deaths within contemporary Romanian borders are estimated at 748,000.

Eastern Front

Initial actions 

As previously agreed with France, Russian plans at the start of the war were to simultaneously advance into Austrian Galicia and East Prussia as soon as possible. Although their attack on Galicia was largely successful, and the invasions achieved their aim of forcing Germany to divert troops from the Western Front, the speed of mobilisation meant they did so without much of their heavy equipment and support functions. These weaknesses contributed to Russian defeats at Tannenberg and the Masurian Lakes in August and September 1914, forcing them to withdraw from East Prussia with heavy losses. By spring 1915, they had also retreated from Galicia, and the May 1915 Gorlice–Tarnów offensive then allowed the Central Powers to invade Russian-occupied Poland. On 5August, the loss of Warsaw forced the Russians to abandon their Polish territories.

Despite the successful June 1916 Brusilov offensive against the Austrians in eastern Galicia, shortages of supplies, heavy losses and command failures prevented the Russians from fully exploiting their victory. However, it was one of the most significant and impactful offensives of the war, diverting German resources from Verdun, relieving Austro-Hungarian pressure on the Italians, and convincing Romania to enter the war on the side of the Allies on 27 August. It also fatally weakened both the Austrian and Russian armies, whose offensive capabilities were badly affected by their losses and increased the disillusionment with the war that ultimately led to the Russian revolutions.

Meanwhile, unrest grew in Russia as the Tsar remained at the front, with the home front controlled by Empress Alexandra. Her increasingly incompetent rule and food shortages in urban areas led to widespread protests and the murder of her favourite, Grigori Rasputin, at the end of 1916.

Central Powers peace overtures 

On 12 December 1916, after ten brutal months of the Battle of Verdun and a successful offensive against Romania, Germany attempted to negotiate a peace with the Allies. However, this attempt was rejected out of hand as a "duplicitous war ruse".

Soon after, US president Woodrow Wilson attempted to intervene as a peacemaker, asking in a note for both sides to state their demands and start negotiations. Lloyd George's War Cabinet considered the German offer to be a ploy to create divisions amongst the Allies. After initial outrage and much deliberation, they took Wilson's note as a separate effort, signalling that the United States was on the verge of entering the war against Germany following the "submarine outrages". While the Allies debated a response to Wilson's offer, the Germans chose to rebuff it in favour of "a direct exchange of views". Learning of the German response, the Allied governments were free to make clear demands in their response of 14 January. They sought restoration of damages, the evacuation of occupied territories, reparations for France, Russia and Romania, and a recognition of the principle of nationalities. This included the liberation of Italians, Slavs, Romanians, Czecho-Slovaks, and the creation of a "free and united Poland". On the question of security, the Allies sought guarantees that would prevent or limit future wars, complete with sanctions, as a condition of any peace settlement. The negotiations failed and the Entente powers rejected the German offer on the grounds that Germany had not put forward any specific proposals.

1917; Timeline of major developments

March to November 1917; Russian Revolution 

By the end of 1916, Russian casualties totalled nearly five million killed, wounded or captured, with major urban areas affected by food shortages and high prices. In March 1917, Tsar Nicholas ordered the military to forcibly suppress a wave of strikes in Petrograd but the troops refused to fire on the crowds. Revolutionaries set up the Petrograd Soviet and fearing a left-wing takeover, the State Duma forced Nicholas to abdicate and established the Russian Provisional Government, which confirmed Russia's willingness to continue the war. However, the Petrograd Soviet refused to disband, creating competing power centres and caused confusion and chaos, with frontline soldiers becoming increasingly demoralised and unwilling to fight on.

In the summer of 1917 a Central Powers offensive began in Romania under the command of August von Mackensen to knock Romania out of the war. Resulting in the battles of Oituz, Mărăști and Mărășești where up to 1,000,000 Central Powers troops were present. The battles lasted from 22 July to 3 September and eventually the Romanian army was victorious. August von Mackensen could not plan for another offensive as he had to transfer troops to the Italian Front.

Following the Tsar's abdication, Vladimir Lenin—with the help of the German government—was ushered by train from Switzerland into Russia on 16 April 1917. Discontent and the weaknesses of the Provisional Government led to a rise in the popularity of the Bolshevik Party, led by Lenin, which demanded an immediate end to the war. The Revolution of November was followed in December by an armistice and negotiations with Germany. At first, the Bolsheviks refused the German terms, but when German troops began marching across Ukraine unopposed, the new government acceded to the Treaty of Brest-Litovsk on 3March 1918. The treaty ceded vast territories, including Finland, Estonia, Latvia, Lithuania, parts of Poland and Ukraine to the Central Powers. Despite this enormous German success, the manpower required by the Germans to occupy the captured territory may have contributed to the failure of their Spring Offensive, and secured relatively little food or other materiel for the Central Powers war effort.

With the Russian Empire out of the war, Romania found itself alone on the Eastern Front and signed the Treaty of Bucharest with the Central Powers in May 1918, ending the state of war between Romania and the Central Powers. Under the terms of the treaty, Romania had to give territory to Austria-Hungary and Bulgaria, and lease its oil reserves to Germany. However, the terms also included the Central Powers recognition of the union of Bessarabia with Romania.

April 1917: the United States enters the war 

The United States was a major supplier of war materiel to the Allies but remained neutral in 1914; many opposed the idea of involvement in "foreign wars", while German Americans made up over 10% of the total population in 1913. On 7May 1915, 128 Americans died when the British Passenger ship Lusitania was sunk by a German submarine. President Woodrow Wilson demanded an apology and warned the United States would not tolerate unrestricted submarine warfare but refused to be drawn into the war. When more Americans died after the sinking of SS Arabic in August, Bethman-Hollweg ordered an end to such attacks. Wilson argued he was "too proud to fight", although former president Theodore Roosevelt denounced the idea of "setting a spiritual example [to others] by sitting idle, uttering cheap platitudes and picking up their trade". Despite growing pro-war sentiment, Wilson was narrowly re-elected as president in 1916.

By the end of 1916, the British naval blockade was causing serious shortages in Germany and Wilhelm approved the resumption of unrestricted submarine warfare on 1 February 1917. While the German government recognised this action was likely to bring America into the war, the navy claimed they could starve Britain into submission in less than six months. The military position also appeared stable, at least for the foreseeable future. Despite heavy losses at Verdun and the Somme during 1916, withdrawal to the newly created Hindenburg Line would enable the Westheer to conserve its troops, while it was clear Russia was on the brink of revolution. The combination meant Germany was willing to gamble it could force the Allies to make peace before the US could intervene in any meaningful way.

Although Wilson severed diplomatic relations on 2 February, he was reluctant to start hostilities without overwhelming public support. On 24 February, he was presented with the Zimmermann Telegram; drafted in January by German Foreign Secretary Arthur Zimmermann, it was intercepted and decoded by British intelligence, who shared it with their American counterparts. Already financing Russian Bolsheviks and anti-British Irish nationalists, Zimmermann hoped to exploit nationalist feelings in Mexico caused by American incursions during the Pancho Villa Expedition. He promised President Carranza support for a war against the United States and help in recovering Texas, New Mexico, and Arizona, although this offer was promptly rejected. Publication of the telegram on 1 March caused an upsurge in support for war but this quickly subsided.

The most significant factor in creating the support Wilson needed was the German submarine offensive, which not only cost American lives, but paralysed trade as ships were reluctant to put to sea. This caused food shortages in cities along the East Coast and on 22 March, Congress approved the arming of merchant ships. Now committed to war, in his speech to Congress on 2 April Wilson presented it as a crusade "against human greed and folly, against Germany, and for justice, peace and civilisation". On 6 April, Congress declared war on Germany as an "Associated Power" of the Allies. At this stage they were not at war with the other Central Powers.

The United States Navy sent a battleship group to Scapa Flow to join the Grand Fleet and provided convoy escorts. In April 1917, the United States Army had fewer than 300,000 men, including National Guard units, compared to British and French armies of 4.1 and 8.3 million respectively. The Selective Service Act of 1917 drafted 2.8 million men, although training and equipping such numbers was a huge logistical challenge. By June 1918, over 667,000 members of the American Expeditionary Forces, or AEF, had been transported to France, a figure which reached 2 million by the end of November. However, American tactical doctrine was still based on pre-1914 principles, a world away from the combined arms approach used by the French and British in 1918. US commanders were initially slow to accept such ideas, leading to heavy casualties and it was not until the last month of the war that these failings were rectified.

Despite his conviction Germany must be defeated, Wilson went to war to ensure the US played a leading role in shaping the peace, which meant preserving the AEF as a separate military force, rather than being absorbed into British or French units as his Allies wanted. He was strongly supported by AEF commander General John J. Pershing, a proponent of pre-1914 "open warfare" who considered the French and British emphasis on artillery as misguided and incompatible with American "offensive spirit". Much to the frustration of his Allies, who had suffered heavy losses in 1917, he insisted on retaining control of American troops and refused to commit them to the front line until able to operate as independent units. As a result, the first significant US involvement was the Meuse–Argonne offensive in late September 1918.

April to June; Nivelle Offensive and French Army mutinies 

Verdun cost the French nearly 400,000 casualties, while the horrific conditions severely impacted morale, leading to a number of incidents of indiscipline. Although relatively minor, they reflected a belief among the rank and file that their sacrifices were not appreciated by their government or senior officers. Combatants on both sides claimed the battle was the most psychologically exhausting of the entire war; recognising this, Philippe Pétain frequently rotated divisions, a process known as the noria system. While this ensured units were withdrawn before their ability to fight was significantly eroded, it meant a high proportion of the French army was affected by the battle. By the beginning of 1917, morale was brittle, even in divisions with good combat records.

In December 1916, Robert Nivelle replaced Pétain as commander of French armies on the Western Front and began planning a spring attack in Champagne, part of a joint Franco-British operation. Nivelle claimed the capture of his main objective, the Chemin des Dames, would achieve a massive breakthrough and cost no more than 15,000 casualties. Poor security meant German intelligence was well informed on tactics and timetables, but despite this, when the attack began on 16 April the French made substantial gains, before being brought to a halt by the newly built and extremely strong defences of the Hindenburg Line. Nivelle persisted with frontal assaults and by 25 April the French had suffered nearly 135,000 casualties, including 30,000 dead, most incurred in the first two days.

Concurrent British attacks at Arras were more successful, although ultimately of little strategic value. Operating as a separate unit for the first time, the Canadian Corps capture of Vimy Ridge during the battle is viewed by many Canadians as a defining moment in creating a sense of national identity. Although Nivelle continued the offensive, on 3 May the 21st Division, which had been involved in some of the heaviest fighting at Verdun, refused orders to go into battle, initiating the French Army mutinies; within days, acts of "collective indiscipline" had spread to 54 divisions, while over 20,000 deserted. Unrest was almost entirely confined to the infantry, whose demands were largely non-political, including better economic support for families at home, and regular periods of leave, which Nivelle had ended.

Although the vast majority remained willing to defend their own lines, they refused to participate in offensive action, reflecting a complete breakdown of trust in the army leadership. Nivelle was removed from command on 15 May and replaced by Pétain, who resisted demands for drastic punishment and set about restoring morale by improving conditions. While exact figures are still debated, only 27 men were actually executed, with another 3,000 sentenced to periods of imprisonment; however, the psychological effects were long-lasting, one veteran commenting "Pétain has purified the unhealthy atmosphere...but they have ruined the heart of the French soldier".

The last large-scale offensive of this period was a British attack (with French support) at Passchendaele (July–November 1917). This offensive opened with great promise for the Allies, before bogging down in the October mud. Casualties, though disputed, were roughly equal, at some 200,000–400,000 per side.

The victory of the Central Powers at the Battle of Caporetto led the Allies to convene the Rapallo conference at which they formed the Supreme War Council to co-ordinate planning. Previously, British and French armies had operated under separate commands.

In December, the Central Powers signed an armistice with Russia, thus freeing large numbers of German troops for use in the west. With German reinforcements and new American troops pouring in, the outcome was to be decided on the Western Front. The Central Powers knew that they could not win a protracted war, but they held high hopes for success based on a final quick offensive. Furthermore, both sides became increasingly fearful of social unrest and revolution in Europe. Thus, both sides urgently sought a decisive victory.

In 1917, Emperor Charles I of Austria secretly attempted separate peace negotiations with Clemenceau, through his wife's brother Sixtus in Belgium as an intermediary, without the knowledge of Germany. Italy opposed the proposals. When the negotiations failed, his attempt was revealed to Germany, resulting in a diplomatic catastrophe.

Ottoman Empire conflict, 1917–1918 

In March and April 1917, at the First and Second Battles of Gaza, German and Ottoman forces stopped the advance of the Egyptian Expeditionary Force, which had begun in August 1916 at the Battle of Romani.
At the end of October, the Sinai and Palestine campaign resumed, when General Edmund Allenby's XXth Corps, XXI Corps and Desert Mounted Corps won the Battle of Beersheba. Two Ottoman armies were defeated a few weeks later at the Battle of Mughar Ridge and, early in December, Jerusalem was captured following another Ottoman defeat at the Battle of Jerusalem. About this time, Friedrich Freiherr Kress von Kressenstein was relieved of his duties as the Eighth Army's commander, replaced by Djevad Pasha, and a few months later the commander of the Ottoman Army in Palestine, Erich von Falkenhayn, was replaced by Otto Liman von Sanders.

In early 1918, the front line was extended and the Jordan Valley was occupied, following the First Transjordan and the Second Transjordan attacks by British Empire forces in March and April 1918. In March, most of the Egyptian Expeditionary Force's British infantry and Yeomanry cavalry were sent to the Western Front as a consequence of the Spring Offensive. They were replaced by Indian Army units. During several months of reorganisation and training of the summer, a number of attacks were carried out on sections of the Ottoman front line. These pushed the front line north to more advantageous positions for the Entente in preparation for an attack and to acclimatise the newly arrived Indian Army infantry. It was not until the middle of September that the integrated force was ready for large-scale operations.

The reorganised Egyptian Expeditionary Force, with an additional mounted division, broke Ottoman forces at the Battle of Megiddo in September 1918. In two days, the British and Indian infantry, supported by a creeping barrage, broke the Ottoman front line and captured the headquarters of the Eighth Army (Ottoman Empire) at Tulkarm, the continuous trench lines at Tabsor, Arara, and the Seventh Army (Ottoman Empire) headquarters at Nablus. The Desert Mounted Corps rode through the break in the front line created by the infantry. During virtually continuous operations by Australian Light Horse, British mounted Yeomanry, Indian Lancers, and New Zealand Mounted Rifle brigades in the Jezreel Valley, they captured Nazareth, Afulah and Beisan, Jenin, along with Haifa on the Mediterranean coast and Daraa east of the Jordan River on the Hejaz railway. Samakh and Tiberias on the Sea of Galilee were captured on the way northwards to Damascus. Meanwhile, Chaytor's Force of Australian light horse, New Zealand mounted rifles, Indian, British West Indies and Jewish infantry captured the crossings of the Jordan River, Es Salt, Amman and at Ziza most of the Fourth Army (Ottoman Empire). The Armistice of Mudros, signed at the end of October, ended hostilities with the Ottoman Empire when fighting was continuing north of Aleppo.

15 August 1917: peace offer by the Pope 

On or shortly before 15 August 1917 Pope Benedict XV made a peace proposal suggesting:
 No annexations
 No indemnities, except to compensate for severe war damage in Belgium and parts of France and of Serbia
 A solution to the problems of Alsace-Lorraine, Trentino and Trieste
 Restoration of the Kingdom of Poland
 Germany to pull out of Belgium and France
 Germany's overseas colonies to be returned to Germany
 General disarmament
 A Supreme Court of arbitration to settle future disputes between nations
 The freedom of the seas
 Abolish all retaliatory economic conflicts
 No point in ordering reparations, because so much damage had been caused to all belligerents

July to November; British offensive at Passchendaele 

The Battle of Passchendaele took place on the Western Front, from July to November 1917. The British were fighting for control of the ridges south and east of the Belgian city of Ypres in West Flanders, as part of a strategy decided by the Allies at conferences in November 1916 and May 1917. Passchendaele lies on the last ridge east of Ypres, 5 mi (8.0 km) from Roulers (now Roeselare), a junction of the Bruges-(Brugge)-to-Kortrijk railway. The station at Roulers was on the main supply route of the German 4th Army. Once Passchendaele Ridge had been captured, the Allied advance was to continue to a line from Thourout (now Torhout) to Couckelaere (Koekelare).

1918; Timeline of major developments

German spring offensive 

Ludendorff drew up plans (codenamed Operation Michael) for the 1918 offensive on the Western Front. The spring offensive sought to divide the British and French forces with a series of feints and advances. The German leadership hoped to end the war before significant US forces arrived. The operation commenced on 21 March 1918 with an attack on British forces near Saint-Quentin.

British and French trenches were penetrated using novel infiltration tactics, also named Hutier tactics after General Oskar von Hutier, by specially trained units called stormtroopers. Previously, attacks had been characterised by long artillery bombardments and massed assaults. In the spring offensive of 1918, however, Ludendorff used artillery only briefly and infiltrated small groups of infantry at weak points. They attacked command and logistics areas and bypassed points of serious resistance. More heavily armed infantry then destroyed these isolated positions. This German success relied greatly on the element of surprise.

The front moved to within  of Paris. Three heavy Krupp railway guns fired 183 shells on the capital, causing many Parisians to flee. The initial offensive was so successful that Kaiser Wilhelm II declared 24 March a national holiday. Many Germans thought victory was near. After heavy fighting, however, the offensive was halted. Lacking tanks or motorised artillery, the Germans were unable to consolidate their gains. The problems of re-supply were also exacerbated by increasing distances that now stretched over terrain that was shell-torn and often impassable to traffic.

Following Operation Michael, Germany launched Operation Georgette against the northern English Channel ports. The Allies halted the drive after limited territorial gains by Germany. The German Army to the south then conducted Operations Blücher and Yorck, pushing broadly towards Paris. Germany launched Operation Marne (Second Battle of the Marne) on 15 July, in an attempt to encircle Reims. The resulting counter-attack, which started the Hundred Days Offensive, marked the first successful Allied offensive of the war. By 20 July, the Germans had retreated across the Marne to their starting lines, having achieved little, and the German Army never regained the initiative. German casualties between March and April 1918 were 270,000, including many highly trained stormtroopers.

Meanwhile, Germany was falling apart at home. Anti-war marches became frequent and morale in the army fell. Industrial output was half the 1913 levels.

Hundred Days Offensive 

The Allied counteroffensive, known as the Hundred Days Offensive, began on 8August 1918, with the Battle of Amiens. The defenders displayed a marked collapse in morale, causing Ludendorff to refer to this day as the "Black Day of the German army".

Rather than continuing the Amiens battle past the point of initial success, as had been done so many times in the past, the Allies shifted attention elsewhere. Allied leaders had now realised that to continue an attack after resistance had hardened was a waste of lives, and it was better to turn a line than to try to roll over it. They began to undertake attacks in quick order to take advantage of successful advances on the flanks, then broke them off when each attack lost its initial impetus.

The day after the Offensive began, Ludendorff said: "We cannot win the war any more, but we must not lose it either." On 11 August, he offered his resignation to the Kaiser, who refused it, replying, "I see that we must strike a balance. We have nearly reached the limit of our powers of resistance. The war must be ended." On 13 August, at Spa, Hindenburg, Ludendorff, the Chancellor, and Foreign Minister Hintz agreed that the war could not be ended militarily and, on the following day, the German Crown Council decided that victory in the field was now most improbable. Austria and Hungary warned that they could continue the war only until December, and Ludendorff recommended immediate peace negotiations. Prince Rupprecht warned Prince Maximilian of Baden: "Our military situation has deteriorated so rapidly that I no longer believe we can hold out over the winter; it is even possible that a catastrophe will come earlier."

Battle of Albert 

British and Dominion forces launched the next phase of the campaign with the Battle of Albert on 21 August. The assault was widened by French and then further British forces in the following days. During the last week of August, the Allied pressure along a  front against the enemy was heavy and unrelenting. From German accounts, "Each day was spent in bloody fighting against an ever and again on-storming enemy, and nights passed without sleep in retirements to new lines."

Faced with these advances, on 2 September the German Oberste Heeresleitung ("Supreme Army Command") issued orders to withdraw in the south to the Hindenburg Line. This ceded without a fight the salient seized the previous April. According to Ludendorff, "We had to admit the necessity ... to withdraw the entire front from the Scarpe to the Vesle." In nearly four weeks of fighting beginning on 8August, over 100,000 German prisoners were taken. The German High Command realised that the war was lost and made attempts to reach a satisfactory end. On 10 September Hindenburg urged peace moves to Emperor Charles of Austria, and Germany appealed to the Netherlands for mediation. On 14 September Austria sent a note to all belligerents and neutrals suggesting a meeting for peace talks on neutral soil, and on 15 September Germany made a peace offer to Belgium. Both peace offers were rejected.

Allied advance to the Hindenburg Line 

In September the Allies advanced to the Hindenburg Line in the north and centre. The Germans continued to fight strong rear-guard actions and launched numerous counterattacks, but positions and outposts of the Line continued to fall, with the BEF alone taking 30,441 prisoners in the last week of September. On 24 September an assault by both the British and French came within  of St. Quentin. The Germans had now retreated to positions along or behind the Hindenburg Line. That same day, Supreme Army Command informed the leaders in Berlin that armistice talks were inevitable.

The final assault on the Hindenburg Line began with the Meuse-Argonne offensive, launched by American and French troops on 26 September. The following week, co-operating American and French units broke through in Champagne at the Battle of Blanc Mont Ridge, forcing the Germans off the commanding heights, and closing towards the Belgian frontier. On 8October the line was pierced again by British and Dominion troops at the Battle of Cambrai. The German army had to shorten its front and use the Dutch frontier as an anchor to fight rear-guard actions as it fell back towards Germany.

When Bulgaria signed a separate armistice on 29 September, Ludendorff, having been under great stress for months, suffered something similar to a breakdown. It was evident that Germany could no longer mount a successful defence. The collapse of the Balkans meant that Germany was about to lose its main supplies of oil and food. Its reserves had been used up, even as US troops kept arriving at the rate of 10,000 per day.

Breakthrough of Macedonian Front 

Allied forces started the Vardar offensive on 15 September at two key points: Dobro Pole and near Dojran Lake. In the Battle of Dobro Pole, the Serbian and French armies had success after a three day long battle with relatively small casualties, and subsequently made a breakthrough in the front, something which was rarely seen in World War I. After the front was broken, Allied forces started to liberate Serbia and reached Skopje at 29 Septembar after which Bulgaria signed an armistice with the Allies on 30 September. German Emperor Wilhelm II wrote a telegram to Bulgarian Tsar Ferdinand I: "Disgraceful! 62,000 Serbs decided the war!".

Allied armies continued the liberation of Serbia while Germany unsuccessfully tried to establish new front lines near Niš by sending troops from Romania. After the Serbian army entered Niš on 11 October, Germany left Austro-Hungary to organize the Balkan front. On 1 November Serbian forces liberated Belgrade and started to cross over the border with Austria-Hungary. Austria-Hungary was politically disintegrating and signed an armistice with Italy on 3 November, leaving Germany alone in Europe. On 6 November the Serbian Army liberated Sarajevo and Novi Sad on 9 November. The non-German peoples of Austria-Hungary started to organize independent states in the territory of Austria-Hungary, which it was unable to prevent.

German Revolution 1918–1919 

News of Germany's impending military defeat spread throughout the German armed forces. The threat of mutiny was rife. Admiral Reinhard Scheer and Ludendorff decided to launch a last attempt to restore the "valour" of the German Navy.

In northern Germany, the German Revolution of 1918–1919 began at the end of October 1918. Units of the German Navy refused to set sail for a last, large-scale operation in a war they believed to be as good as lost, initiating the uprising. The sailors' revolt, which then ensued in the naval ports of Wilhelmshaven and Kiel, spread across the whole country within days and led to the proclamation of a republic on 9November 1918, shortly thereafter to the abdication of Kaiser Wilhelm II, and to German surrender.

New German government surrenders 
With the military faltering and with widespread loss of confidence in the Kaiser leading to his abdication and fleeing of the country, Germany moved towards surrender. Prince Maximilian of Baden took charge of a new government on 3October as Chancellor of Germany to negotiate with the Allies. Negotiations with President Wilson began immediately, in the hope that he would offer better terms than the British and French. Wilson demanded a constitutional monarchy and parliamentary control over the German military. There was no resistance when the Social Democrat Philipp Scheidemann on 9November declared Germany to be a republic. The Kaiser, kings and other hereditary rulers all were removed from power and Wilhelm fled to exile in the Netherlands. It was the end of Imperial Germany; a new Germany had been born as the Weimar Republic.

Armistices and capitulations 

The collapse of the Central Powers came swiftly. Bulgaria was the first to sign an armistice, the Armistice of Salonica on 29 September 1918. German Emperor Wilhelm II in his telegram to Bulgarian Tsar Ferdinand I described situation: "Disgraceful! 62,000 Serbs decided the war!". On the same day, the German Supreme Army Command informed Kaiser Wilhelm II and the Imperial Chancellor Count Georg von Hertling, that the military situation facing Germany was hopeless.

On 24 October, the Italians began a push that rapidly recovered territory lost after the Battle of Caporetto. This culminated in the Battle of Vittorio Veneto, which marked the end of the Austro-Hungarian Army as an effective fighting force. The offensive also triggered the disintegration of the Austro-Hungarian Empire. During the last week of October, declarations of independence were made in Budapest, Prague, and Zagreb. On 29 October, the imperial authorities asked Italy for an armistice, but the Italians continued advancing, reaching Trento, Udine, and Trieste. On 3November, Austria-Hungary sent a flag of truce to ask for an armistice (Armistice of Villa Giusti). The terms, arranged by telegraph with the Allied Authorities in Paris, were communicated to the Austrian commander and accepted. The Armistice with Austria was signed in the Villa Giusti, near Padua, on 3November. Austria and Hungary signed separate armistices following the overthrow of the Habsburg monarchy. In the following days, the Italian Army occupied Innsbruck and all Tyrol with over 20,000 soldiers.

On 30 October, the Ottoman Empire capitulated, signing the Armistice of Mudros.

On 11 November, at 5:00 am, an armistice with Germany was signed in a railroad carriage at Compiègne. At 11 am on 11 November 1918—"the eleventh hour of the eleventh day of the eleventh month"—a ceasefire came into effect. During the six hours between the signing of the armistice and its taking effect, opposing armies on the Western Front began to withdraw from their positions, but fighting continued along many areas of the front, as commanders wanted to capture territory before the war ended. The occupation of the Rhineland took place following the Armistice. The occupying armies consisted of American, Belgian, British and French forces.

In November 1918, the Allies had ample supplies of manpower and materiel to invade Germany. These factors enabled Hindenburg and other senior German leaders to spread the story that their armies had not really been defeated. This resulted in the stab-in-the-back myth, which attributed Germany's defeat not to its inability to continue fighting (even though up to a million soldiers were suffering from the 1918 flu pandemic and unfit to fight), but to the public's failure to respond to its "patriotic calling" and the supposed sabotage of the war effort, particularly by Jews, Socialists, and Bolsheviks.

The Allies had much more potential wealth they could spend on the war. One estimate (using 1913 US dollars) is that the Allies spent $58 billion on the war and the Central Powers only $25 billion. Among the Allies, the UK spent $21 billion and the US $17 billion; among the Central Powers Germany spent $20 billion.

Aftermath 

In the aftermath of the war, four empires disappeared: the German, Austro-Hungarian, Ottoman, and Russian. Numerous nations regained their former independence, and new ones were created. Four dynasties, together with their ancillary aristocracies, fell as a result of the war: the Romanovs, the Hohenzollerns, the Habsburgs, and the Ottomans. Belgium and Serbia were badly damaged, as was France, with 1.4 million soldiers dead, not counting other casualties. Germany and Russia were similarly affected.

Formal end of the war 

A formal state of war between the two sides persisted for another seven months, until the signing of the Treaty of Versailles with Germany on 28 June 1919. The United States Senate did not ratify the treaty despite public support for it, and did not formally end its involvement in the war until the Knox–Porter Resolution was signed on 2July 1921 by President Warren G. Harding. For the United Kingdom and the British Empire, the state of war ceased under the provisions of the Termination of the Present War (Definition) Act 1918 with respect to:

 Germany on 10 January 1920.
 Austria on 16 July 1920.
 Bulgaria on 9 August 1920.
 Hungary on 26 July 1921.
 Turkey on 6 August 1924.

After the Treaty of Versailles, treaties with Austria, Hungary, Bulgaria, and the Ottoman Empire were signed. The Ottoman Empire disintegrated, with much of its Levant territory awarded to various Allied powers as protectorates. The Turkish core in Anatolia was reorganised as the Republic of Turkey. The Ottoman Empire was to be partitioned by the Treaty of Sèvres of 1920. This treaty was never ratified by the Sultan and was rejected by the Turkish National Movement, leading to the victorious Turkish War of Independence and the much less stringent 1923 Treaty of Lausanne.

Some war memorials date the end of the war as being when the Versailles Treaty was signed in 1919, which was when many of the troops serving abroad finally returned home; by contrast, most commemorations of the war's end concentrate on the armistice of 11 November 1918. Legally, the formal peace treaties were not complete until the last, the Treaty of Lausanne, was signed. Under its terms, the Allied forces left Constantinople on 23 August 1923.

Peace treaties and national boundaries 
After the war, there grew a certain amount of academic focus on the causes of war and on the elements that could make peace flourish. In part, these led to the institutionalization of peace and conflict studies, security studies and International Relations (IR) in general. The Paris Peace Conference imposed a series of peace treaties on the Central Powers officially ending the war. The 1919 Treaty of Versailles dealt with Germany and, building on Wilson's 14th point, brought into being the League of Nations on 28 June 1919.

The Central Powers had to acknowledge responsibility for "all the loss and damage to which the Allied and Associated Governments and their nationals have been subjected as a consequence of the war imposed upon them by" their aggression. In the Treaty of Versailles, this statement was Article 231. This article became known as the War Guilt clause as the majority of Germans felt humiliated and resentful. Overall the Germans felt they had been unjustly dealt with by what they called the "diktat of Versailles". German historian Hagen Schulze said the Treaty placed Germany "under legal sanctions, deprived of military power, economically ruined, and politically humiliated." Belgian historian Laurence Van Ypersele emphasises the central role played by memory of the war and the Versailles Treaty in German politics in the 1920s and 1930s:
Active denial of war guilt in Germany and German resentment at both reparations and continued Allied occupation of the Rhineland made widespread revision of the meaning and memory of the war problematic. The legend of the "stab in the back" and the wish to revise the "Versailles diktat", and the belief in an international threat aimed at the elimination of the German nation persisted at the heart of German politics. Even a man of peace such as [Gustav] Stresemann publicly rejected German guilt. As for the Nazis, they waved the banners of domestic treason and international conspiracy in an attempt to galvanise the German nation into a spirit of revenge. Like a Fascist Italy, Nazi Germany sought to redirect the memory of the war to the benefit of its own policies.

Meanwhile, new nations liberated from German rule viewed the treaty as recognition of wrongs committed against small nations by much larger aggressive neighbours. The Peace Conference required all the defeated powers to pay reparations for all the damage done to civilians. However, owing to economic difficulties and Germany being the only defeated power with an intact economy, the burden fell largely on Germany.

Austria-Hungary was partitioned into several successor states, largely but not entirely along ethnic lines. Apart from Austria and Hungary, Czechoslovakia, Italy, Poland, Romania and Yugoslavia received territories from the Dual Monarchy (the formerly separate and autonomous Kingdom of Croatia-Slavonia was incorporated into Yugoslavia). The details were contained in the Saint-Germain-en-Laye and the Treaty of Trianon. As a result, Hungary lost 64% of its total population, decreasing from 20.9 million to 7.6 million and losing 31% (3.3 out of 10.7 million) of its ethnic Hungarians. According to the 1910 census, speakers of the Hungarian language included approximately 54% of the entire population of the Kingdom of Hungary. Within the country, numerous ethnic minorities were present: 16.1% Romanians, 10.5% Slovaks, 10.4% Germans, 2.5% Ruthenians, 2.5% Serbs and 8% others. Between 1920 and 1924, 354,000 Hungarians fled former Hungarian territories attached to Romania, Czechoslovakia, and Yugoslavia.

The Russian Empire, which had withdrawn from the war in 1917 after the October Revolution, lost much of its western frontier as the newly independent nations of Estonia, Finland, Latvia, Lithuania, and Poland were carved from it. Romania took control of Bessarabia in April 1918.

National identities 

After 123 years, Poland re-emerged as an independent country. The Kingdom of Serbia and its dynasty, as a "minor Entente nation" and the country with the most casualties per capita, became the backbone of a new multinational state, the Kingdom of Serbs, Croats and Slovenes, later renamed Yugoslavia. Czechoslovakia, combining the Kingdom of Bohemia with parts of the Kingdom of Hungary, became a new nation. Romania would unite all Romanian-speaking people under a single state leading to Greater Romania. Russia became the Soviet Union and lost Finland, Estonia, Lithuania, and Latvia, which became independent countries. The Ottoman Empire was soon replaced by Turkey and several other countries in the Middle East.

In the British Empire, the war unleashed new forms of nationalism. In Australia and New Zealand, the Battle of Gallipoli became known as those nations' "Baptism of Fire". It was the first major war in which the newly established countries fought, and it was one of the first times that Australian troops fought as Australians, not just subjects of the British Crown, and independent national identities for these nations took hold. Anzac Day, commemorating the Australian and New Zealand Army Corps (ANZAC), celebrates this defining moment.

After the Battle of Vimy Ridge, where the Canadian divisions fought together for the first time as a single corps, Canadians began to refer to their country as a nation "forged from fire". Having succeeded on the same battleground where the "mother countries" had previously faltered, they were for the first time respected internationally for their own accomplishments. Canada entered the war as a Dominion of the British Empire and remained so, although it emerged with a greater measure of independence. When Britain declared war in 1914, the dominions were automatically at war; at the conclusion, Canada, Australia, New Zealand, and South Africa were individual signatories of the Treaty of Versailles.

Lobbying by Chaim Weizmann and fear that American Jews would encourage the United States to support Germany culminated in the British government's Balfour Declaration of 1917, endorsing creation of a Jewish homeland in Palestine. A total of more than 1,172,000 Jewish soldiers served in the Allied and Central Power forces in World WarI, including 275,000 in Austria-Hungary and 450,000 in Tsarist Russia.

The establishment of the modern state of Israel and the roots of the continuing Israeli–Palestinian conflict are partially found in the unstable power dynamics of the Middle East that resulted from World WarI. Before the end of the war, the Ottoman Empire had maintained a modest level of peace and stability throughout the Middle East. With the fall of the Ottoman government, power vacuums developed and conflicting claims to land and nationhood began to emerge. The political boundaries drawn by the victors of World WarI were quickly imposed, sometimes after only cursory consultation with the local population. These continue to be problematic in the 21st-century struggles for national identity. While the dissolution of the Ottoman Empire at the end of World WarI was pivotal in contributing to the modern political situation of the Middle East, including the Arab-Israeli conflict, the end of Ottoman rule also spawned lesser-known disputes over water and other natural resources.

The prestige of Germany and German things in Latin America remained high after the war but did not recover to its pre-war levels. Indeed, in Chile the war bought an end to a period of intense scientific and cultural influence writer Eduardo de la Barra scorningly called "the German bewitchment".

The Czechoslovak Legion fought on the sides of the Entente, seeking to win support for an independent Czechoslovakia. The Legion in Russia was established in September 1914, in December 1917 in France (including volunteers from America) and in April 1918 in Italy. Czechoslovak Legion troops defeated the Austro-Hungarian army at the Ukrainian village of Zboriv, in July 1917. After this success, the number of Czechoslovak legionaries increased, as well as Czechoslovak military power. In the Battle of Bakhmach, the Legion defeated the Germans and forced them to make a truce.

In Russia, they were heavily involved in the Russian Civil War, siding with the Whites against the Bolsheviks, at times controlling most of the Trans-Siberian Railway and conquering all the major cities of Siberia. The presence of the Czechoslovak Legion near Yekaterinburg appears to have been one of the motivations for the Bolshevik execution of the Tsar and his family in July 1918. Legionaries arrived less than a week afterwards and captured the city. Because Russia's European ports were not safe, the corps was evacuated by a long detour via the port of Vladivostok. The last transport was the American ship Heffron in September 1920.

The Transylvanian and Bukovinian Romanians who were taken prisoners of war fought as the Romanian Volunteer Corps in Russia, Romanian Legion of Siberia and Romanian Legion in Italy. Taking part in the Eastern Front as part of the Russian Army and since summer 1917 in the Romanian front as part of the Romanian Army. As a supporter of the White movement with the Czechoslovak Legion against the Red Army during the Russian Civil War. In the battles of Montello, Vittorio Veneto, Sisemolet, Piave, Cimone, Monte Grappa, Nervesa and Ponte Delle Alpi as part of the Italian Army against Austria-Hungary and in 1919 as part of the Romanian Army in the Hungarian-Romanian War.

In the late spring of 1918, three new states were formed in the South Caucasus: the First Republic of Armenia, the Azerbaijan Democratic Republic, and the Democratic Republic of Georgia, which declared their independence from the Russian Empire. Two other minor entities were established, the Centrocaspian Dictatorship and South West Caucasian Republic (the former was liquidated by Azerbaijan in the autumn of 1918 and the latter by a joint Armenian-British task force in early 1919). With the withdrawal of the Russian armies from the Caucasus front in the winter of 1917–18, the three major republics braced for an imminent Ottoman advance, which commenced in the early months of 1918. Solidarity was briefly maintained when the Transcaucasian Federative Republic was created in the spring of 1918, but this collapsed in May when the Georgians asked for and received protection from Germany and the Azerbaijanis concluded a treaty with the Ottoman Empire that was more akin to a military alliance. Armenia was left to fend for itself and struggled for five months against the threat of a full-fledged occupation by the Ottoman Turks before defeating them at the Battle of Sardarabad.

Health effects 

Of the 60 million European military personnel who were mobilised from 1914 to 1918, 8 million were killed, 7 million were permanently disabled, and 15 million were seriously injured. Germany lost 15.1% of its active male population, Austria-Hungary lost 17.1%, and France lost 10.5%. France mobilised 7.8 million men, of which 1.4 million died and 3.2 million were injured. Among the soldiers mutilated and surviving in the trenches, approximately 15,000 sustained horrific facial injuries, causing them to undergo social stigma and marginalisation; they were called the gueules cassées. In Germany, civilian deaths were 474,000 higher than in peacetime, due in large part to food shortages and malnutrition that weakened resistance to disease. These excess deaths are estimated as 271,000 in 1918, plus another 71,000 in the first half of 1919 when the blockade was still in effect. By the end of the war, starvation caused by famine had killed approximately 100,000 people in Lebanon. Between 5and 10 million people died in the Russian famine of 1921. By 1922, there were between 4.5 million and 7million homeless children in Russia as a result of nearly a decade of devastation from World WarI, the Russian Civil War, and the subsequent famine of 1920–1922. Numerous anti-Soviet Russians fled the country after the Revolution; by the 1930s, the northern Chinese city of Harbin had 100,000 Russians. Thousands more emigrated to France, England, and the United States.

The Australian prime minister, Billy Hughes, wrote to the British prime minister, David Lloyd George, "You have assured us that you cannot get better terms. I much regret it, and hope even now that some way may be found of securing agreement for demanding reparation commensurate with the tremendous sacrifices made by the British Empire and her Allies." Australia received £5,571,720 war reparations, but the direct cost of the war to Australia had been £376,993,052, and, by the mid-1930s, repatriation pensions, war gratuities, interest and sinking fund charges were £831,280,947. Of about 416,000 Australians who served, about 60,000 were killed and another 152,000 were wounded.

Diseases flourished in the chaotic wartime conditions. In 1914 alone, louse-borne epidemic typhus killed 200,000 in Serbia. From 1918 to 1922, Russia had about 25 million infections and 3million deaths from epidemic typhus. In 1923, 13 million Russians contracted malaria, a sharp increase from the pre-war years. Starting in early 1918, a major influenza epidemic known as Spanish flu spread around the world, accelerated by the movement of large number of soldiers, often crammed together in camps and transport ships with poor sanitation. Overall, the Spanish flu killed at least 17 million to 25 million people, including an estimated 2.64 million Europeans and as many as 675,000 Americans. Moreover, between 1915 and 1926, an epidemic of encephalitis lethargica spread around the world affecting nearly five million people.
The social disruption and widespread violence of the Russian Revolution of 1917 and the ensuing Russian Civil War sparked more than 2,000 pogroms in the former Russian Empire, mostly in Ukraine. An estimated 60,000–200,000 civilian Jews were killed in the atrocities.

In the aftermath of World War I, Greece fought against Turkish nationalists led by Mustafa Kemal, a war that eventually resulted in a massive population exchange between the two countries under the Treaty of Lausanne. According to various sources, several hundred thousand Greeks died during this period, which was tied in with the Greek genocide.

Technology

Ground warfare 

World War I began as a clash of 20th-century technology and 19th-century tactics, with the inevitably large ensuing casualties. By the end of 1917, however, the major armies, now numbering millions of men, had modernised and were making use of telephone, wireless communication, armoured cars, tanks (especially with the advent of the first prototype tank, Little Willie), and aircraft. Infantry formations were reorganised, so that 100-man companies were no longer the main unit of manoeuvre; instead, squads of 10 or so men, under the command of a junior NCO, were favoured.

Artillery also underwent a revolution. In 1914, cannons were positioned in the front line and fired directly at their targets. By 1917, indirect fire with guns (as well as mortars and even machine guns) was commonplace, using new techniques for spotting and ranging, notably, aircraft and the often overlooked field telephone. Counter-battery missions became commonplace, also, and sound detection was used to locate enemy batteries.

Germany was far ahead of the Allies in using heavy indirect fire. The British had a 6-inch (152 mm) howitzer, but it was so heavy it had to be hauled to the field in pieces and assembled. The Germans also fielded Austrian  and  guns and, even at the beginning of the war, had inventories of various calibres of Minenwerfer, which were ideally suited for trench warfare.

On 27 June 1917 the Germans used the biggest gun in the world, Batterie Pommern, nicknamed "Lange Max".

Much of the combat involved trench warfare, in which hundreds often died for each metre gained. Many of the deadliest battles in history occurred during World WarI. Such battles include Ypres, the Marne, Cambrai, the Somme, Verdun, and Gallipoli. The Germans employed the Haber process of nitrogen fixation to provide their forces with a constant supply of gunpowder despite the British naval blockade. Artillery was responsible for the largest number of casualties and consumed vast quantities of explosives. The large number of head wounds caused by exploding shells and fragmentation forced the combatant nations to develop the modern steel helmet, led by the French, who introduced the Adrian helmet in 1915. It was quickly followed by the Brodie helmet, worn by British Imperial and US troops, and in 1916 by the distinctive German Stahlhelm, a design, with improvements, still in use today.

The widespread use of chemical warfare was a distinguishing feature of the conflict. Gases used included chlorine, mustard gas and phosgene. Relatively few war casualties were caused by gas, as effective countermeasures to gas attacks were quickly created, such as gas masks. The use of chemical warfare and small-scale strategic bombing (as opposed to tactical bombing) were both outlawed by the Hague Conventions of 1899 and 1907, and both proved to be of limited effectiveness, though they captured the public imagination.

The most powerful land-based weapons were railway guns, weighing dozens of tons apiece. The German version were nicknamed Big Berthas, even though the namesake was not a railway gun.

Trenches, machine guns, air reconnaissance, barbed wire, and modern artillery with fragmentation shells helped bring the battle lines of World WarI to a stalemate. The British and the French sought a solution with the creation of the tank and mechanised warfare. The British first tanks were used during the Battle of the Somme on 15 September 1916. Mechanical reliability was an issue, but the experiment proved its worth. Within a year, the British were fielding tanks by the hundreds, and they showed their potential during the Battle of Cambrai in November 1917, by breaking the Hindenburg Line, while combined arms teams captured 8,000 enemy soldiers and 100 guns. Meanwhile, the French introduced the first tanks with a rotating turret, the Renault FT, which became a decisive tool of the victory. The conflict also saw the introduction of light automatic weapons and submachine guns, such as the Lewis gun, the M1918 Browning Automatic Rifle, and the MP 18.

Another new weapon, the flamethrower, was first used by the German army and later adopted by other forces. Although not of high tactical value, the flamethrower was a powerful, demoralising weapon that caused terror on the battlefield.

Trench railways evolved to supply the enormous quantities of food, water, and ammunition required to support large numbers of soldiers in areas where conventional transportation systems had been destroyed. Internal combustion engines and improved traction systems for automobiles and trucks/lorries eventually rendered trench railways obsolete.

Naval 

Germany deployed U-boats (submarines) after the war began. Alternating between restricted and unrestricted submarine warfare in the Atlantic, the Imperial German Navy employed them to deprive the British Isles of vital supplies. The deaths of British merchant sailors and the seeming invulnerability of U-boats led to the development of depth charges (1916), hydrophones (sonar, 1917), blimps, hunter-killer submarines (HMS R-1, 1917), forward-throwing anti-submarine weapons, and dipping hydrophones (the latter two both abandoned in 1918). To extend their operations, the Germans proposed supply submarines (1916). Most of these would be forgotten in the interwar period until World WarII revived the need.

Aviation 

Fixed-wing aircraft were first used militarily by the Italians in Libya on 23 October 1911 during the Italo-Turkish War for reconnaissance, soon followed by the dropping of grenades and aerial photography the next year. By 1914, their military utility was obvious. They were initially used for reconnaissance and ground attack. To shoot down enemy planes, anti-aircraft guns and fighter aircraft were developed. Strategic bombers were created, principally by the Germans and British, though the former used Zeppelins as well. Towards the end of the conflict, aircraft carriers were used for the first time, with HMS Furious launching Sopwith Camels in a raid to destroy the Zeppelin hangars at Tønder in 1918.

Manned observation balloons, floating high above the trenches, were used as stationary reconnaissance platforms, reporting enemy movements and directing artillery. Balloons commonly had a crew of two, equipped with parachutes, so that if there was an enemy air attack the crew could parachute to safety. At the time, parachutes were too heavy to be used by pilots of aircraft (with their marginal power output), and smaller versions were not developed until the end of the war; they were also opposed by the British leadership, who feared they might promote cowardice.

Recognised for their value as observation platforms, balloons were important targets for enemy aircraft. To defend them against air attack, they were heavily protected by anti-aircraft guns and patrolled by friendly aircraft; to attack them, unusual weapons such as air-to-air rockets were tried. Thus, the reconnaissance value of blimps and balloons contributed to the development of air-to-air combat between all types of aircraft, and to the trench stalemate, because it was impossible to move large numbers of troops undetected. The Germans conducted air raids on England during 1915 and 1916 with airships, hoping to damage British morale and cause aircraft to be diverted from the front lines, and indeed the resulting panic led to the diversion of several squadrons of fighters from France.

Radio telecommunication 

The introduction of radio telegraphy was a significant step in communication during World War I. The stations utilised at that time were spark-gap transmitters. As an example, the information of the start of World War I was transmitted to German South West Africa on 2 August 1914 via radio telegraphy from the Nauen transmitter station via a relay station in Kamina and Lomé in Togo to the radio station in Windhoek.

War crimes

Rape of Belgium 

The German invaders treated any resistance—such as sabotaging rail lines—as illegal and immoral, and shot the offenders and burned buildings in retaliation. In addition, they tended to suspect that most civilians were potential francs-tireurs (guerrillas) and, accordingly, took and sometimes killed hostages from among the civilian population. The German army executed over 6,500 French and Belgian civilians between August and November 1914, usually in near-random large-scale shootings of civilians ordered by junior German officers. The German Army destroyed 15,000–20,000 buildings—most famously the university library at Louvain—and generated a wave of refugees of over a million people. Over half the German regiments in Belgium were involved in major incidents. Thousands of workers were shipped to Germany to work in factories. British propaganda dramatising the Rape of Belgium attracted much attention in the United States, while Berlin said it was both lawful and necessary because of the threat of franc-tireurs like those in France in 1870. The British and French magnified the reports and disseminated them at home and in the United States, where they played a major role in dissolving support for Germany.

Austro-Hungarian war crimes in Serbia 

Austria's propaganda machinery spread anti-Serb sentiment with the slogan "Serbien muss sterbien" (Serbia must die). During the war Austro-Hungarian officers in Serbia ordered troops to "exterminate and burn everything that is Serbian", and hangings and mass shootings were everyday occurrences. Austrian historian, Anton Holzer, wrote that the Austro-Hungarian army carried out "countless and systematic massacres…against the Serbian population. The soldiers invaded villages and rounded up unarmed men, women and children. They were either shot dead, bayoneted to death or hanged. The victims were locked into barns and burned alive. Women were sent up to the front lines and mass-raped. The inhabitants of whole villages were taken as hostages and humiliated and tortured."

A claim from a local spy that "traitors" were hiding in a certain house was enough to sentence the whole family to death by hanging. Priests were often hanged, under the accusation of spreading the spirit of treason among the people. Multiple source state that 30,000 Serbs, mostly civilians, were hanged by Austro-Hungarian forces in the first year of the war alone.

Baralong incidents 

On 19 August 1915, the German submarine U-27 was sunk by the British Q-ship . All German survivors were summarily executed by Baralongs crew on the orders of Lieutenant Godfrey Herbert, the captain of the ship. The shooting was reported to the media by American citizens who were on board the Nicosia, a British freighter loaded with war supplies, which was stopped by U-27 just minutes before the incident.

On 24 September, Baralong destroyed U-41, which was in the process of sinking the cargo ship Urbino. According to Karl Goetz, the submarine's commander, Baralong continued to fly the US flag after firing on U-41 and then rammed the lifeboat carrying the German survivors, sinking it.

Torpedoing of HMHS Llandovery Castle 

The Canadian hospital ship  was torpedoed by the German submarine SM U-86 on 27 June 1918 in violation of international law. Only 24 of the 258 medical personnel, patients, and crew survived. Survivors reported that the U-boat surfaced and ran down the lifeboats, machine-gunning survivors in the water. The U-boat captain, Helmut Brümmer-Patzig, was charged with war crimes in Germany following the war, but escaped prosecution by going to the Free City of Danzig, beyond the jurisdiction of German courts.

Blockade of Germany 

After the war, the German government claimed that approximately 763,000 German civilians died from starvation and disease during the war because of the Allied blockade. An academic study done in 1928 put the death toll at 424,000. Germany protested that the Allies had used starvation as a weapon of war. Sally Marks argued that the German accounts of a hunger blockade are a "myth," as Germany did not face the starvation level of Belgium and the regions of Poland and northern France that it occupied. According to the British judge and legal philosopher Patrick Devlin, "The War Orders given by the Admiralty on 26 August [1914] were clear enough. All food consigned to Germany through neutral ports was to be captured and all food consigned to Rotterdam was to be presumed consigned to Germany." According to Devlin, this was a serious breach of International Law, equivalent to German minelaying.

Chemical weapons in warfare 

The German army was the first to successfully deploy chemical weapons during the Second Battle of Ypres (22 April – 25 May 1915), after German scientists working under the direction of Fritz Haber at the Kaiser Wilhelm Institute developed a method to weaponize chlorine. The use of chemical weapons was sanctioned by the German High Command in an effort to force Allied soldiers out of their entrenched positions, complementing rather than supplanting more lethal conventional weapons. In time, chemical weapons were deployed by all major belligerents throughout the war, inflicting approximately 1.3 million casualties, but relatively few fatalities: About 90,000 in total. For example, there were an estimated 186,000 British chemical weapons casualties during the war (80% of which were the result of exposure to the vesicant sulfur mustard, introduced to the battlefield by the Germans in July 1917, which burns the skin at any point of contact and inflicts more severe lung damage than chlorine or phosgene), and up to one-third of American casualties were caused by them. The Russian Army reportedly suffered roughly 500,000 chemical weapon casualties in World WarI. The use of chemical weapons in warfare was in direct violation of the 1899 Hague Declaration Concerning Asphyxiating Gases and the 1907 Hague Convention on Land Warfare, which prohibited their use.

The effect of poison gas was not limited to combatants. Civilians were at risk from the gases as winds blew the poison gases through their towns, and they rarely received warnings or alerts of potential danger. In addition to absent warning systems, civilians often did not have access to effective gas masks. An estimated 100,000–260,000 civilian casualties were caused by chemical weapons during the conflict and tens of thousands more (along with military personnel) died from scarring of the lungs, skin damage, and cerebral damage in the years after the conflict ended. Many commanders on both sides knew such weapons would cause major harm to civilians but nonetheless continued to use them. British Field Marshal Douglas Haig wrote in his diary, "My officers and I were aware that such weapons would cause harm to women and children living in nearby towns, as strong winds were common in the battlefront. However, because the weapon was to be directed against the enemy, none of us were overly concerned at all."

The war damaged chemistry's prestige in European societies, in particular the German variety.

Genocide and ethnic cleansing

Ottoman Empire 

The ethnic cleansing of the Ottoman Empire's Armenian population, including mass deportations and executions, during the final years of the Ottoman Empire is considered genocide. The Ottomans carried out organised and systematic massacres of the Armenian population at the beginning of the war and manipulated acts of Armenian resistance by portraying them as rebellions to justify further extermination. In early 1915, a number of Armenians volunteered to join the Russian forces and the Ottoman government used this as a pretext to issue the Tehcir Law (Law on Deportation), which authorised the deportation of Armenians from the Empire's eastern provinces to Syria between 1915 and 1918. The Armenians were intentionally marched to death and a number were attacked by Ottoman brigands. While an exact number of deaths is unknown, the International Association of Genocide Scholars estimates 1.5 million. The government of Turkey has consistently denied the genocide, arguing that those who died were victims of inter-ethnic fighting, famine, or disease during World WarI; these claims are rejected by most historians.

Other ethnic groups were similarly attacked by the Ottoman Empire during this period, including Assyrians and Greeks, and some scholars consider those events to be part of the same policy of extermination. At least 250,000 Assyrian Christians, about half of the population, and 350,000–750,000 Anatolian and Pontic Greeks were killed between 1915 and 1922.

Russian Empire 

Many pogroms accompanied the Russian Revolution of 1917 and the ensuing Russian Civil War. 60,000–200,000 civilian Jews were killed in the atrocities throughout the former Russian Empire (mostly within the Pale of Settlement in present-day Ukraine). There were an estimated 7–12 million casualties during the Russian Civil War, mostly civilians.

Soldiers' experiences 

The British soldiers of the war were initially volunteers but increasingly were conscripted into service. Surviving veterans, returning home, often found they could discuss their experiences only amongst themselves. Grouping together, they formed "veterans' associations" or "Legions". A small number of personal accounts of American veterans have been collected by the Library of Congress Veterans History Project.

Prisoners of war 

About eight million soldiers surrendered and were held in POW camps during the war. All nations pledged to follow the Hague Conventions on fair treatment of prisoners of war, and the survival rate for POWs was generally much higher than that of combatants at the front. Individual surrenders were uncommon; large units usually surrendered en masse. At the siege of Maubeuge about 40,000 French soldiers surrendered, at the battle of Galicia Russians took about 100,000 to 120,000 Austrian captives, at the Brusilov Offensive about 325,000 to 417,000 Germans and Austrians surrendered to Russians, and at the Battle of Tannenberg, 92,000 Russians surrendered. When the besieged garrison of Kaunas surrendered in 1915, some 20,000 Russians became prisoners, at the battle near Przasnysz (February–March 1915) 14,000 Germans surrendered to Russians, and at the First Battle of the Marne about 12,000 Germans surrendered to the Allies. 25–31% of Russian losses (as a proportion of those captured, wounded, or killed) were to prisoner status; for Austria-Hungary 32%, for Italy 26%, for France 12%, for Germany 9%; for Britain 7%. Prisoners from the Allied armies totalled about 1.4 million (not including Russia, which lost 2.5–3.5 million soldiers as prisoners). From the Central Powers about 3.3 million soldiers became prisoners; most of them surrendered to Russians. Germany held 2.5 million prisoners; Russia held 2.2–2.9 million; while Britain and France held about 720,000. Most were captured just before the Armistice. The United States held 48,000. The most dangerous moment was the act of surrender when helpless soldiers were sometimes gunned down. Once prisoners reached a camp, conditions were, in general, satisfactory (and much better than in World WarII), thanks in part to the efforts of the International Red Cross and inspections by neutral nations. However, conditions were terrible in Russia: starvation was common for prisoners and civilians alike; about 15–20% of the prisoners in Russia died, and in Central Powers imprisonment 8% of Russians. In Germany, food was scarce, but only 5% died.

The Ottoman Empire often treated POWs poorly. Some 11,800 British Empire soldiers, most of them Indians, became prisoners after the siege of Kut in Mesopotamia in April 1916; 4,250 died in captivity. Although many were in a poor condition when captured, Ottoman officers forced them to march  to Anatolia. A survivor said: "We were driven along like beasts; to drop out was to die." The survivors were then forced to build a railway through the Taurus Mountains.

In Russia, when the prisoners from the Czechoslovak Legion of the Austro-Hungarian army were released in 1917, they re-armed themselves and briefly became a military and diplomatic force during the Russian Civil War.

While the Allied prisoners of the Central Powers were quickly sent home at the end of active hostilities, the same treatment was not granted to Central Power prisoners of the Allies and Russia, many of whom served as forced labour, e.g., in France until 1920. They were released only after many approaches by the Red Cross to the Supreme War Council. German prisoners were still being held in Russia as late as 1924.

Military attachés and war correspondents 

Military and civilian observers from every major power closely followed the course of the war. Many were able to report on events from a perspective somewhat akin to modern "embedded" positions within the opposing land and naval forces.

Support for the war 

In the Balkans, Yugoslav nationalists such as the leader, Ante Trumbić, strongly supported the war, desiring the freedom of Yugoslavs from Austria-Hungary and other foreign powers and the creation of an independent Yugoslavia. The Yugoslav Committee, led by Trumbić, was formed in Paris on 30 April 1915 but shortly moved its office to London. In April 1918, the Rome Congress of Oppressed Nationalities met, including Czechoslovak, Italian, Polish, Transylvanian, and Yugoslav representatives who urged the Allies to support national self-determination for the peoples residing within Austria-Hungary.

In the Middle East, Arab nationalism soared in Ottoman territories in response to the rise of Turkish nationalism during the war, with Arab nationalist leaders advocating the creation of a pan-Arab state. In 1916, the Arab Revolt began in Ottoman-controlled territories of the Middle East in an effort to achieve independence.

In East Africa, Iyasu V of Ethiopia was supporting the Dervish state who were at war with the British in the Somaliland campaign. Von Syburg, the German envoy in Addis Ababa, said, "now the time has come for Ethiopia to regain the coast of the Red Sea driving the Italians home, to restore the Empire to its ancient size." The Ethiopian Empire was on the verge of entering World WarI on the side of the Central Powers before Iyasu's overthrow at the Battle of Segale due to Allied pressure on the Ethiopian aristocracy. Iyasu was accused of converting to Islam. According to Ethiopian historian Bahru Zewde, the evidence used to prove Iyasu's conversion was a doctored photo of Iyasu wearing a turban provided by the Allies. Some historians claim the British spy T. E. Lawrence forged the Iyasu photo.

A number of socialist parties initially supported the war when it began in August 1914. But European socialists split on national lines, with the concept of class conflict held by radical socialists such as Marxists and syndicalists being overborne by their patriotic support for the war. Once the war began, Austrian, British, French, German, and Russian socialists followed the rising nationalist current by supporting their countries' intervention in the war.

Italian nationalism was stirred by the outbreak of the war and was initially strongly supported by a variety of political factions. One of the most prominent and popular Italian nationalist supporters of the war was Gabriele D'Annunzio, who promoted Italian irredentism and helped sway the Italian public to support intervention in the war. The Italian Liberal Party, under the leadership of Paolo Boselli, promoted intervention in the war on the side of the Allies and used the Dante Alighieri Society to promote Italian nationalism. Italian socialists were divided on whether to support the war or oppose it; some were militant supporters of the war, including Benito Mussolini and Leonida Bissolati. However, the Italian Socialist Party decided to oppose the war after anti-militarist protestors were killed, resulting in a general strike called Red Week. The Italian Socialist Party purged itself of pro-war nationalist members, including Mussolini. Mussolini, a syndicalist who supported the war on grounds of irredentist claims on Italian-populated regions of Austria-Hungary, formed the pro-interventionist Il Popolo d'Italia and the Fasci Rivoluzionario d'Azione Internazionalista ("Revolutionary Fasci for International Action") in October 1914 that later developed into the Fasci Italiani di Combattimento in 1919, the origin of fascism. Mussolini's nationalism enabled him to raise funds from Ansaldo (an armaments firm) and other companies to create Il Popolo d'Italia to convince socialists and revolutionaries to support the war.

Patriotic Funds 
On both sides there was large scale fundraising for soldiers' welfare, their dependents and for those injured. The Nail Men were a German example. Around the British empire there were many Patriotic Funds, including the Royal Patriotic Fund Corporation, Canadian Patriotic Fund, Queensland Patriotic Fund and, by 1919, there were 983 funds in New Zealand. At the start of the next world war the New Zealand funds were reformed, having been criticised as overlapping, wasteful and abused, but 11 were still functioning in 2002.

Opposition to the war 

Once war was declared, many socialists and trade unions backed their governments. Among the exceptions were the Bolsheviks, the Socialist Party of America, the Italian Socialist Party, and people like Karl Liebknecht, Rosa Luxemburg, and their followers in Germany.

Pope Benedict XV, elected to the papacy less than three months into World WarI, made the war and its consequences the main focus of his early pontificate. In stark contrast to his predecessor, five days after his election he spoke of his determination to do what he could to bring peace. His first encyclical, Ad beatissimi Apostolorum, given 1November 1914, was concerned with this subject. Benedict XV found his abilities and unique position as a religious emissary of peace ignored by the belligerent powers. The 1915 Treaty of London between Italy and the Triple Entente included secret provisions whereby the Allies agreed with Italy to ignore papal peace moves towards the Central Powers. Consequently, the publication of Benedict's proposed seven-point Peace Note of August 1917 was roundly ignored by all parties except Austria-Hungary.

In Britain in 1914, the Public Schools Officers' Training Corps annual camp was held at Tidworth Pennings, near Salisbury Plain. Head of the British Army, Lord Kitchener, was to review the cadets, but the imminence of the war prevented him. General Horace Smith-Dorrien was sent instead. He surprised the two-or-three thousand cadets by declaring (in the words of Donald Christopher Smith, a Bermudian cadet who was present),
that war should be avoided at almost any cost, that war would solve nothing, that the whole of Europe and more besides would be reduced to ruin, and that the loss of life would be so large that whole populations would be decimated. In our ignorance I, and many of us, felt almost ashamed of a British General who uttered such depressing and unpatriotic sentiments, but during the next four years, those of us who survived the holocaust—probably not more than one-quarter of us—learned how right the General's prognosis was and how courageous he had been to utter it.
Voicing these sentiments did not hinder Smith-Dorrien's career, or prevent him from doing his duty in World WarI to the best of his abilities.

Many countries jailed those who spoke out against the conflict. These included Eugene Debs in the United States and Bertrand Russell in Britain. In the US, the Espionage Act of 1917 and Sedition Act of 1918 made it a federal crime to oppose military recruitment or make any statements deemed "disloyal". Publications at all critical of the government were removed from circulation by postal censors, and many served long prison sentences for statements of fact deemed unpatriotic.

A number of nationalists opposed intervention, particularly within states that the nationalists were hostile to. Although the vast majority of Irish people consented to participate in the war in 1914 and 1915, a minority of advanced Irish nationalists staunchly opposed taking part. The war began amid the Home Rule crisis in Ireland that had resurfaced in 1912, and by July 1914 there was a serious possibility of an outbreak of civil war in Ireland. Irish nationalists and Marxists attempted to pursue Irish independence, culminating in the Easter Rising of 1916, with Germany sending 20,000 rifles to Ireland to stir unrest in Britain. The UK government placed Ireland under martial law in response to the Easter Rising, though once the immediate threat of revolution had dissipated, the authorities did try to make concessions to nationalist feeling. However, opposition to involvement in the war increased in Ireland, resulting in the Conscription Crisis of 1918.

Other opposition came from conscientious objectors—some socialist, some religious—who refused to fight. In Britain, 16,000 people asked for conscientious objector status. Some of them, most notably prominent peace activist Stephen Hobhouse, refused both military and alternative service. Many suffered years of prison, including solitary confinement and bread and water diets. Even after the war, in Britain many job advertisements were marked "No conscientious objectors need apply".

The Central Asian revolt started in the summer of 1916, when the Russian Empire government ended its exemption of Muslims from military service.

In 1917, a series of French Army Mutinies led to dozens of soldiers being executed and many more imprisoned.

On 1–4 May 1917, about 100,000 workers and soldiers of Petrograd, and after them, the workers and soldiers of other Russian cities, led by the Bolsheviks, demonstrated under banners reading "Down with the war!" and "all power to the soviets!" The mass demonstrations resulted in a crisis for the Russian Provisional Government. In Milan, in May 1917, Bolshevik revolutionaries organised and engaged in rioting calling for an end to the war, and managed to close down factories and stop public transportation. The Italian army was forced to enter Milan with tanks and machine guns to face Bolsheviks and anarchists, who fought violently until 23 May when the army gained control of the city. Almost 50 people (including three Italian soldiers) were killed and over 800 people arrested.

In September 1917, Russian soldiers in France began questioning why they were fighting for the French at all and mutinied. In Russia, opposition to the war led to soldiers also establishing their own revolutionary committees, which helped foment the October Revolution of 1917, with the call going up for "bread, land, and peace". The Decree on Peace, written by Vladimir Lenin, was passed on 8November 1917, following the success of the October Revolution. The Bolsheviks agreed to a peace treaty with Germany, the Treaty of Brest-Litovsk, despite its harsh conditions. The German Revolution of 1918–1919 led to the abdication of the Kaiser and German surrender.

Conscription 

Conscription was common in most European countries. However, it was controversial in English-speaking countries. It was especially unpopular among minority ethnic groups—especially the Irish Catholics in Ireland and Australia, and the French Catholics in Canada.

Canada 

In Canada, the issue produced a major political crisis that permanently alienated the Francophones. It opened a political gap between French Canadians, who believed their true loyalty was to Canada and not to the British Empire, and members of the Anglophone majority, who saw the war as a duty to their British heritage.

Australia 

Australia had a form of conscription at the outbreak of the war, as compulsory military training had been introduced in 1911. However, the Defence Act 1903 provided that unexempted males could be called upon only for home defence during times of war, not overseas service. Prime Minister Billy Hughes wished to amend the legislation to require conscripts to serve overseas, and held two non-binding referendums – one in 1916 and one in 1917 – in order to secure public support. Both were defeated by narrow margins, with farmers, the labour movement, the Catholic Church, and Irish-Australians combining to campaign for the "No" vote. The issue of conscription caused the 1916 Australian Labor Party split. Hughes and his supporters were expelled from the party, forming the National Labor Party and then the Nationalist Party. Despite the referendum results, the Nationalists won a landslide victory at the 1917 federal election.

Britain 

In Britain, conscription resulted in the calling up of nearly every physically fit man in Britain—six of ten million eligible. Of these, about 750,000 died. Most deaths were those of young unmarried men; however, 160,000 wives lost husbands and 300,000 children lost fathers. Conscription during the First World War began when the British government passed the Military Service Act in 1916. The act specified that single men aged 18 to 40 years old were liable to be called up for military service unless they were widowed, with children, or ministers of a religion. There was a system of Military Service Tribunals to adjudicate upon claims for exemption upon the grounds of performing civilian work of national importance, domestic hardship, health, and conscientious objection. The law went through several changes before the war ended. Married men were exempt in the original Act, although this was changed in June 1916. The age limit was also eventually raised to 51 years old. Recognition of work of national importance also diminished, and in the last year of the war, there was some support for the conscription of clergy. Conscription lasted until mid-1919. Due to the political situation in Ireland, conscription was never applied there; only in England, Scotland and Wales.

United States 

In the United States, conscription began in 1917 and was generally well received, with a few pockets of opposition in isolated rural areas. The administration decided to rely primarily on conscription, rather than voluntary enlistment, to raise military manpower after only 73,000 volunteers enlisted out of the initial 1million target in the first six weeks of the war. In 1917 10 million men were registered. This was deemed to be inadequate, so age ranges were increased and exemptions reduced, and so by the end of 1918 this increased to 24 million men that were registered with nearly 3million inducted into the military services. The draft was universal and included blacks on the same terms as whites, although they served in different units. In all 367,710 black Americans were drafted (13% of total), compared to 2,442,586 white (87% of total).

Forms of resistance ranged from peaceful protest to violent demonstrations and from humble letter-writing campaigns asking for mercy to radical newspapers demanding reform. The most common tactics were dodging and desertion, and many communities sheltered and defended their draft dodgers as political heroes. Many socialists were jailed for "obstructing the recruitment or enlistment service". The most famous was Eugene Debs, head of the Socialist Party of America, who ran for president in 1920 from his prison cell. In 1917 a number of radicals and anarchists challenged the new draft law in federal court, arguing that it was a direct violation of the Thirteenth Amendment's prohibition against slavery and involuntary servitude. The Supreme Court unanimously upheld the constitutionality of the draft act in the Selective Draft Law Cases on 7January 1918.

Austria-Hungary 
Like all the armies of mainland Europe, Austria-Hungary relied on conscription to fill its ranks. Officer recruitment, however, was voluntary. The effect of this at the start of the war was that well over a quarter of the rank and file were Slavs, while more than 75% of the officers were ethnic Germans. This was much resented. The army has been described as being "run on colonial lines" and the Slav soldiers as "disaffected". Thus conscription contributed greatly to Austria's disastrous performance on the battlefield.

Diplomacy 

The non-military diplomatic and propaganda interactions among the nations were designed to build support for the cause or to undermine support for the enemy. For the most part, wartime diplomacy focused on five issues: propaganda campaigns; defining and redefining the war goals, which became harsher as the war went on; luring neutral nations (Italy, Ottoman Empire, Bulgaria, Romania) into the coalition by offering slices of enemy territory; and encouragement by the Allies of nationalistic minority movements inside the Central Powers, especially among Czechs, Poles, and Arabs. In addition, there were multiple peace proposals coming from neutrals, or one side or the other; none of them progressed very far.

Legacy and memory 

The first tentative efforts to comprehend the meaning and consequences of modern warfare began during the initial phases of the war, and this process continued throughout and after the end of hostilities, and is still underway, more than a century later. As late as 2007, signs warning visitors to keep off certain paths at battlefield sites like Verdun and Somme remained in place as unexploded ordnance continued to pose a danger to farmers living near former battlegrounds. In France and Belgium locals who discover caches of unexploded munitions are assisted by weapons disposal units. In some places, plant life has still not returned to normal.

Historiography 

Teaching World War I has presented special challenges. When compared with World War II, the First World War is often thought to be "a wrong war fought for the wrong reasons". It lacks the metanarrative of good versus evil that characterizes the Second World War. Lacking recognizable heroes and villains, it is often taught thematically, invoking tropes like the wastefulness of war, the folly of generals and the innocence of soldiers. The complexity of the conflict is mostly obscured by these oversimplifications. George Kennan referred to the war as the "seminal catastrophe of the 20th century".

Historian Heather Jones argues that the historiography has been reinvigorated by the cultural turn in recent years. Scholars have raised entirely new questions regarding military occupation, radicalisation of politics, race, medical science, gender and mental health. Furthermore, new research has revised our understanding of five major topics that historians have long debated: Why the war began, why the Allies won, whether generals were responsible for high casualty rates, how the soldiers endured the horrors of trench warfare, and to what extent the civilian homefront accepted and endorsed the war effort.

Memorials 

Memorials were erected in thousands of villages and towns. Close to battlefields, those buried in improvised burial grounds were gradually moved to formal graveyards under the care of organisations such as the Commonwealth War Graves Commission, the American Battle Monuments Commission, the German War Graves Commission, and Le Souvenir français. Many of these graveyards also have central monuments to the missing or unidentified dead, such as the Menin Gate Memorial to the Missing and the Thiepval Memorial to the Missing of the Somme.

In 1915 John McCrae, a Canadian army doctor, wrote the poem In Flanders Fields as a salute to those who perished in the Great War. Published in Punch on 8December 1915, it is still recited today, especially on Remembrance Day and Memorial Day.

National World War I Museum and Memorial in Kansas City, Missouri, is a memorial dedicated to all Americans who served in World WarI. The Liberty Memorial was dedicated on 1November 1921, when the supreme Allied commanders spoke to a crowd of more than 100,000 people.

The UK Government has budgeted substantial resources to the commemoration of the war during the period 2014 to 2018. The lead body is the Imperial War Museum. On 3August 2014, French President François Hollande and German President Joachim Gauck together marked the centenary of Germany's declaration of war on France by laying the first stone of a memorial in Vieil Armand, known in German as Hartmannswillerkopf, for French and German soldiers killed in the war. During the Armistice centenary commemorations, French President Emmanuel Macron and German Chancellor Angela Merkel visited the site of the signing of the Armistice of Compiègne and unveiled a plaque to reconciliation.

Cultural memory 

World War I had a lasting impact on collective memory. It was seen by many in Britain as signalling the end of an era of stability stretching back to the Victorian period, and across Europe many regarded it as a watershed. Historian Samuel Hynes explained:

This has become the most common perception of World War I, perpetuated by the art, cinema, poems, and stories published subsequently. Films such as All Quiet on the Western Front, Paths of Glory and King and Country have perpetuated the idea, while war-time films including Camrades, Poppies of Flanders, and Shoulder Arms indicate that the most contemporary views of the war were overall far more positive. Likewise, the art of Paul Nash, John Nash, Christopher Nevinson, and Henry Tonks in Britain painted a negative view of the conflict in keeping with the growing perception, while popular war-time artists such as Muirhead Bone painted more serene and pleasant interpretations subsequently rejected as inaccurate. Several historians like John Terraine, Niall Ferguson and Gary Sheffield have challenged these interpretations as partial and polemical views:

These beliefs did not become widely shared because they offered the only accurate interpretation of wartime events. In every respect, the war was much more complicated than they suggest. In recent years, historians have argued persuasively against almost every popular cliché of World WarI. It has been pointed out that, although the losses were devastating, their greatest impact was socially and geographically limited. The many emotions other than horror experienced by soldiers in and out of the front line, including comradeship, boredom, and even enjoyment, have been recognised. The war is not now seen as a 'fight about nothing', but as a war of ideals, a struggle between aggressive militarism and more or less liberal democracy. It has been acknowledged that British generals were often capable men facing difficult challenges and that it was under their command that the British army played a major part in the defeat of the Germans in 1918: a great forgotten victory.

Though these views have been discounted as "myths", they are common. They have dynamically changed according to contemporary influences, reflecting in the 1950s perceptions of the war as "aimless" following the contrasting Second World War and emphasising conflict within the ranks during times of class conflict in the 1960s. The majority of additions to the contrary are often rejected.

Social trauma 

The social trauma caused by unprecedented rates of casualties manifested itself in different ways, which have been the subject of subsequent historical debate. Over 8 million Europeans died in the war. Millions suffered permanent disabilities. The war gave birth to fascism and Bolshevism and destroyed the dynasties that had ruled the Ottoman, Habsburg, Russian and German Empires.

The optimism of la belle époque was destroyed, and those who had fought in the war were referred to as the Lost Generation. For years afterward, people mourned the dead, the missing, and the many disabled. Many soldiers returned with severe trauma, suffering from shell shock (also called neurasthenia, a condition related to post-traumatic stress disorder). Many more returned home with few after-effects; however, their silence about the war contributed to the conflict's growing mythological status. Though many participants did not share in the experiences of combat or spend any significant time at the front, or had positive memories of their service, the images of suffering and trauma became the widely shared perception. Such historians as Dan Todman, Paul Fussell, and Samuel Heyns have all published works since the 1990s arguing that these common perceptions of the war are factually incorrect.

Discontent in Germany and Austria 
The rise of Nazism and fascism included a revival of the nationalist spirit and a rejection of many post-war changes. Similarly, the popularity of the stab-in-the-back legend (German: Dolchstoßlegende) was a testament to the psychological state of defeated Germany and was a rejection of responsibility for the conflict. This conspiracy theory of the betrayal of the German war effort by Jews became common, and the German populace came to see themselves as victims. The widespread acceptance of the "stab-in-the-back" theory delegitimised the Weimar government and destabilised the system, opening it to extremes of right and left. The same occurred in Austria which did not consider itself responsible for the outbreak of the war and claimed not to have suffered a military defeat.

Communist and fascist movements around Europe drew strength from this theory and enjoyed a new level of popularity. These feelings were most pronounced in areas directly or harshly affected by the war. Adolf Hitler was able to gain popularity by using German discontent with the still controversial Treaty of Versailles. World WarII was in part a continuation of the power struggle never fully resolved by World WarI. Furthermore, it was common for Germans in the 1930s to justify acts of aggression due to perceived injustices imposed by the victors of World WarI. American historian William Rubinstein wrote that:

The 'Age of Totalitarianism' included nearly all the infamous examples of genocide in modern history, headed by the Jewish Holocaust, but also comprising the mass murders and purges of the Communist world, other mass killings carried out by Nazi Germany and its allies, and also the Armenian Genocide of 1915. All these slaughters, it is argued here, had a common origin, the collapse of the elite structure and normal modes of government of much of central, eastern and southern Europe as a result of World WarI, without which surely neither Communism nor Fascism would have existed except in the minds of unknown agitators and crackpots.

Economic effects 

One of the most dramatic effects of the war was the expansion of governmental powers and responsibilities in Britain, France, the United States, and the Dominions of the British Empire. To harness all the power of their societies, governments created new ministries and powers. New taxes were levied and laws enacted, all designed to bolster the war effort; many have lasted to the present. Similarly, the war strained the abilities of some formerly large and bureaucratised governments, such as in Austria-Hungary and Germany.

Gross domestic product (GDP) increased for three Allies (Britain, Italy, and the United States), but decreased in France and Russia, in neutral Netherlands, and in the three main Central Powers. The shrinkage in GDP in Austria, Russia, France, and the Ottoman Empire ranged between 30% and 40%. In Austria, for example, most pigs were slaughtered, so at war's end there was no meat.

In all nations, the government's share of GDP increased, surpassing 50% in both Germany and France and nearly reaching that level in Britain. To pay for purchases in the United States, Britain cashed in its extensive investments in American railroads and then began borrowing heavily from Wall Street. President Wilson was on the verge of cutting off the loans in late 1916 but allowed a great increase in US government lending to the Allies. After 1919, the US demanded repayment of these loans. The repayments were, in part, funded by German reparations that, in turn, were supported by American loans to Germany. This circular system collapsed in 1931 and some loans were never repaid. Britain still owed the United States $4.4 billion of World WarI debt in 1934; the last installment was finally paid in 2015.

Macro- and micro-economic consequences devolved from the war. Families were altered by the departure of many men. With the death or absence of the primary wage earner, women were forced into the workforce in unprecedented numbers. At the same time, industry needed to replace the lost labourers sent to war. This aided the struggle for voting rights for women.

World War I further compounded the gender imbalance, adding to the phenomenon of surplus women. The deaths of nearly one million men during the war in Britain increased the gender gap by almost a million: from 670,000 to 1,700,000. The number of unmarried women seeking economic means grew dramatically. In addition, demobilisation and economic decline following the war caused high unemployment. The war increased female employment; however, the return of demobilised men displaced many from the workforce, as did the closure of many of the wartime factories.

In Britain, rationing was finally imposed in early 1918, limited to meat, sugar, and fats (butter and margarine), but not bread. The new system worked smoothly. From 1914 to 1918, trade union membership doubled, from a little over four million to a little over eight million.

Britain turned to her colonies for help in obtaining essential war materials whose supply from traditional sources had become difficult. Geologists such as Albert Kitson were called on to find new resources of precious minerals in the African colonies. Kitson discovered important new deposits of manganese, used in munitions production, in the Gold Coast.

Article 231 of the Treaty of Versailles (the so-called "war guilt" clause) stated Germany accepted responsibility for "all the loss and damage to which the Allied and Associated Governments and their nationals have been subjected as a consequence of the war imposed upon them by the aggression of Germany and her allies." It was worded as such to lay a legal basis for reparations, and a similar clause was inserted in the treaties with Austria and Hungary. However, neither of them interpreted it as an admission of war guilt." In 1921, the total reparation sum was placed at 132 billion gold marks. However, "Allied experts knew that Germany could not pay" this sum. The total sum was divided into three categories, with the third being "deliberately designed to be chimerical" and its "primary function was to mislead public opinion ... into believing the "total sum was being maintained." Thus, 50 billion gold marks (12.5 billion dollars) "represented the actual Allied assessment of German capacity to pay" and "therefore ... represented the total German reparations" figure that had to be paid.

This figure could be paid in cash or in-kind (coal, timber, chemical dyes, etc.). In addition, some of the territory lost—via the treaty of Versailles—was credited towards the reparation figure as were other acts such as helping to restore the Library of Louvain. By 1929, the Great Depression arrived, causing political chaos throughout the world. In 1932 the payment of reparations was suspended by the international community, by which point Germany had paid only the equivalent of 20.598 billion gold marks in reparations. With the rise of Adolf Hitler, all bonds and loans that had been issued and taken out during the 1920s and early 1930s were cancelled. David Andelman notes "refusing to pay doesn't make an agreement null and void. The bonds, the agreement, still exist." Thus, following the Second World War, at the London Conference in 1953, Germany agreed to resume payment on the money borrowed. On 3October 2010, Germany made the final payment on these bonds.

The war contributed to the evolution of the wristwatch from women's jewellery to a practical everyday item, replacing the pocketwatch, which requires a free hand to operate. Military funding of advancements in radio contributed to the post-war popularity of the medium.

See also 

 Lists of World War I topics
 Outline of World War I
 World War I reparations
 List of military engagements of World War I

Footnotes

References

Bibliography

Sources 
 
 
  (translated from the German)
 
 
 
 
 
 
 
 
 
 
 
 
 
 
 
 
 
 
 
 
 
 
 
 
 
 
 
 
 
 
 
 
 
  
 
 
 
 
 
 
 
 
 
 
 
 
 
 
 
 
 
 
 
 
 
 
 
 
 
 
 
 
 
 
 
 
 
 
 
 
 
 
 
 
 
 
 
 
 
 
 
 
 
 
 
 
 
 
 
 
 
 
 
  also published by Harper as "Ludendorff's Own Story, August 1914 – November 1918: The Great War from the Siege of Liège to the Signing of the Armistice as Viewed from the Grand Headquarters of the German Army"  (original title Meine Kriegserinnerungen, 1914–1918)
 
 
 
 
 
 
 
 

 
 
 
 
 
 
 
 
 
 
 
 
 
 
 
 
 
 
 
 

  Deals with technical developments, including the first dipping hydrophones

Primary sources 
 
  Containing Large Scale Maps of All the Battle Fronts of Europe and Asia, Together With a Military Map of the United States.

Historiography and memory 
 Cornelissen, Christoph, and Arndt Weinrich, eds. Writing the Great War – The Historiography of World War I from 1918 to the Present (2020) online free 
 
 
 
 
  Excerpt 
 
 
 
  Excerpt and text search 
 
 
 
 
  excerpt

Further reading 
 
 
 
 
  Comprises the 11th edition plus three new volumes 30-31-32 that cover events since 1911 with thorough coverage of the war as well as every country and colony.
 
 scans of each page of vol 30-31-32
 
 
 
 
 
 
 
 
  cites "Cf. articles signed XXX in La Revue de Deux Mondes, 1and 15 March 1920"

External links 

 Records on the outbreak of World War I from the UK Parliamentary Collections
 The Heritage of the Great War / First World War. Graphic color photos, pictures and music
 A multimedia history of World War I
 European Newspapers from the start of the First World War and the end of the war
 WWI Films on the European Film Gateway
 The British Pathé WW1 Film Archive
 World War I British press photograph collection – A sampling of images distributed by the British government during the war to diplomats overseas, from the UBC Library Digital Collections
 Personal accounts of American World War I veterans, Veterans History Project, Library of Congress.

Library guides 
 National Library of New Zealand
 State Library of New South Wales
 US Library of Congress
 Indiana University Bloomington 
 New York University 
 University of Alberta
 California State Library, California History Room. Collection: California. State Council of Defense. California War History Committee. Records of Californians who served in World War I, 1918–1922.

 
World Wars
War
Articles containing video clips
Global conflicts
Russo-Turkish wars
Wars involving Armenia
Wars involving Australia
Wars involving Azerbaijan
Wars involving Belgium
Wars involving Bolivia
Wars involving Brazil
Wars involving British India
Wars involving Bulgaria
Wars involving Canada
Wars involving Costa Rica
Wars involving Cuba
Wars involving France
Wars involving Germany
Wars involving Greece
Wars involving Guatemala
Wars involving Haiti
Wars involving Honduras
Wars involving Ireland
Wars involving Italy
Wars involving Japan
Wars involving Korea
Wars involving Liberia
Wars involving Malta
Wars involving Montenegro
Wars involving Nepal
Wars involving New Zealand
Wars involving Nicaragua
Wars involving Panama
Wars involving Portugal
Wars involving Rhodesia
Wars involving Romania
Wars involving Russia
Wars involving Serbia
Wars involving South Africa
Wars involving Sri Lanka
Wars involving Sudan
Wars involving Taiwan
Wars involving Thailand
Wars involving the Habsburg monarchy
Wars involving the Ottoman Empire
Wars involving the Republic of China
Wars involving the states and peoples of Oceania
Wars involving the United Kingdom
Wars involving the United States